

184001–184100 

|-bgcolor=#fefefe
| 184001 ||  || — || March 15, 2004 || Catalina || CSS || — || align=right | 1.2 km || 
|-id=002 bgcolor=#fefefe
| 184002 ||  || — || March 14, 2004 || Socorro || LINEAR || — || align=right | 1.6 km || 
|-id=003 bgcolor=#fefefe
| 184003 ||  || — || March 15, 2004 || Socorro || LINEAR || — || align=right | 1.4 km || 
|-id=004 bgcolor=#fefefe
| 184004 ||  || — || March 15, 2004 || Socorro || LINEAR || V || align=right | 1.2 km || 
|-id=005 bgcolor=#fefefe
| 184005 ||  || — || March 14, 2004 || Kitt Peak || Spacewatch || — || align=right | 1.3 km || 
|-id=006 bgcolor=#fefefe
| 184006 ||  || — || March 15, 2004 || Kitt Peak || Spacewatch || MAS || align=right data-sort-value="0.98" | 980 m || 
|-id=007 bgcolor=#fefefe
| 184007 ||  || — || March 15, 2004 || Socorro || LINEAR || KLI || align=right | 3.1 km || 
|-id=008 bgcolor=#E9E9E9
| 184008 ||  || — || March 15, 2004 || Socorro || LINEAR || MAR || align=right | 1.7 km || 
|-id=009 bgcolor=#fefefe
| 184009 ||  || — || March 15, 2004 || Socorro || LINEAR || V || align=right | 1.3 km || 
|-id=010 bgcolor=#fefefe
| 184010 ||  || — || March 10, 2004 || Palomar || NEAT || — || align=right | 1.8 km || 
|-id=011 bgcolor=#fefefe
| 184011 Andypuckett ||  ||  || March 19, 2004 || Antares || R. Holmes || V || align=right | 1.1 km || 
|-id=012 bgcolor=#fefefe
| 184012 ||  || — || March 16, 2004 || Catalina || CSS || — || align=right | 3.7 km || 
|-id=013 bgcolor=#fefefe
| 184013 ||  || — || March 16, 2004 || Catalina || CSS || V || align=right | 1.3 km || 
|-id=014 bgcolor=#E9E9E9
| 184014 ||  || — || March 17, 2004 || Kitt Peak || Spacewatch || HOF || align=right | 3.6 km || 
|-id=015 bgcolor=#fefefe
| 184015 ||  || — || March 17, 2004 || Kitt Peak || Spacewatch || NYS || align=right | 1.1 km || 
|-id=016 bgcolor=#E9E9E9
| 184016 ||  || — || March 17, 2004 || Kitt Peak || Spacewatch || — || align=right | 1.2 km || 
|-id=017 bgcolor=#fefefe
| 184017 ||  || — || March 30, 2004 || Socorro || LINEAR || — || align=right | 4.1 km || 
|-id=018 bgcolor=#E9E9E9
| 184018 ||  || — || March 16, 2004 || Socorro || LINEAR || — || align=right | 3.0 km || 
|-id=019 bgcolor=#E9E9E9
| 184019 ||  || — || March 16, 2004 || Socorro || LINEAR || — || align=right | 3.7 km || 
|-id=020 bgcolor=#E9E9E9
| 184020 ||  || — || March 16, 2004 || Socorro || LINEAR || — || align=right | 1.6 km || 
|-id=021 bgcolor=#fefefe
| 184021 ||  || — || March 16, 2004 || Kitt Peak || Spacewatch || — || align=right | 1.4 km || 
|-id=022 bgcolor=#fefefe
| 184022 ||  || — || March 17, 2004 || Kitt Peak || Spacewatch || MAS || align=right | 1.1 km || 
|-id=023 bgcolor=#E9E9E9
| 184023 ||  || — || March 18, 2004 || Kitt Peak || Spacewatch || — || align=right | 1.3 km || 
|-id=024 bgcolor=#fefefe
| 184024 ||  || — || March 18, 2004 || Kitt Peak || Spacewatch || — || align=right | 1.2 km || 
|-id=025 bgcolor=#E9E9E9
| 184025 ||  || — || March 16, 2004 || Catalina || CSS || — || align=right | 1.2 km || 
|-id=026 bgcolor=#fefefe
| 184026 ||  || — || March 16, 2004 || Socorro || LINEAR || — || align=right | 1.6 km || 
|-id=027 bgcolor=#E9E9E9
| 184027 ||  || — || March 18, 2004 || Socorro || LINEAR || — || align=right | 1.4 km || 
|-id=028 bgcolor=#fefefe
| 184028 ||  || — || March 19, 2004 || Socorro || LINEAR || — || align=right | 1.5 km || 
|-id=029 bgcolor=#fefefe
| 184029 ||  || — || March 19, 2004 || Socorro || LINEAR || NYS || align=right | 1.00 km || 
|-id=030 bgcolor=#E9E9E9
| 184030 ||  || — || March 19, 2004 || Socorro || LINEAR || EUN || align=right | 1.7 km || 
|-id=031 bgcolor=#E9E9E9
| 184031 ||  || — || March 19, 2004 || Socorro || LINEAR || — || align=right | 1.8 km || 
|-id=032 bgcolor=#E9E9E9
| 184032 ||  || — || March 19, 2004 || Socorro || LINEAR || EUN || align=right | 2.2 km || 
|-id=033 bgcolor=#E9E9E9
| 184033 ||  || — || March 19, 2004 || Socorro || LINEAR || — || align=right | 2.5 km || 
|-id=034 bgcolor=#fefefe
| 184034 ||  || — || March 20, 2004 || Socorro || LINEAR || — || align=right | 1.2 km || 
|-id=035 bgcolor=#d6d6d6
| 184035 ||  || — || March 20, 2004 || Socorro || LINEAR || — || align=right | 3.6 km || 
|-id=036 bgcolor=#E9E9E9
| 184036 ||  || — || March 20, 2004 || Socorro || LINEAR || — || align=right | 1.4 km || 
|-id=037 bgcolor=#E9E9E9
| 184037 ||  || — || March 17, 2004 || Kitt Peak || Spacewatch || — || align=right | 1.1 km || 
|-id=038 bgcolor=#fefefe
| 184038 ||  || — || March 19, 2004 || Socorro || LINEAR || MAS || align=right | 1.2 km || 
|-id=039 bgcolor=#E9E9E9
| 184039 ||  || — || March 17, 2004 || Kitt Peak || Spacewatch || KON || align=right | 4.5 km || 
|-id=040 bgcolor=#E9E9E9
| 184040 ||  || — || March 17, 2004 || Kitt Peak || Spacewatch || — || align=right | 1.4 km || 
|-id=041 bgcolor=#fefefe
| 184041 ||  || — || March 18, 2004 || Socorro || LINEAR || V || align=right | 1.4 km || 
|-id=042 bgcolor=#fefefe
| 184042 ||  || — || March 19, 2004 || Palomar || NEAT || V || align=right | 1.1 km || 
|-id=043 bgcolor=#E9E9E9
| 184043 ||  || — || March 19, 2004 || Palomar || NEAT || — || align=right | 2.3 km || 
|-id=044 bgcolor=#fefefe
| 184044 ||  || — || March 19, 2004 || Palomar || NEAT || V || align=right | 1.1 km || 
|-id=045 bgcolor=#fefefe
| 184045 ||  || — || March 19, 2004 || Socorro || LINEAR || NYS || align=right data-sort-value="0.79" | 790 m || 
|-id=046 bgcolor=#E9E9E9
| 184046 ||  || — || March 20, 2004 || Socorro || LINEAR || — || align=right | 1.4 km || 
|-id=047 bgcolor=#E9E9E9
| 184047 ||  || — || March 18, 2004 || Kitt Peak || Spacewatch || — || align=right | 1.8 km || 
|-id=048 bgcolor=#E9E9E9
| 184048 ||  || — || March 23, 2004 || Socorro || LINEAR || EUN || align=right | 2.5 km || 
|-id=049 bgcolor=#E9E9E9
| 184049 ||  || — || March 20, 2004 || Socorro || LINEAR || — || align=right | 1.6 km || 
|-id=050 bgcolor=#d6d6d6
| 184050 ||  || — || March 21, 2004 || Kitt Peak || Spacewatch || — || align=right | 3.6 km || 
|-id=051 bgcolor=#fefefe
| 184051 ||  || — || March 22, 2004 || Socorro || LINEAR || NYS || align=right | 1.1 km || 
|-id=052 bgcolor=#fefefe
| 184052 ||  || — || March 22, 2004 || Socorro || LINEAR || — || align=right | 1.1 km || 
|-id=053 bgcolor=#E9E9E9
| 184053 ||  || — || March 25, 2004 || Anderson Mesa || LONEOS || — || align=right | 1.6 km || 
|-id=054 bgcolor=#E9E9E9
| 184054 ||  || — || March 21, 2004 || Kitt Peak || Spacewatch || — || align=right | 2.0 km || 
|-id=055 bgcolor=#E9E9E9
| 184055 ||  || — || March 27, 2004 || Socorro || LINEAR || — || align=right | 2.5 km || 
|-id=056 bgcolor=#E9E9E9
| 184056 ||  || — || March 27, 2004 || Socorro || LINEAR || — || align=right | 2.8 km || 
|-id=057 bgcolor=#E9E9E9
| 184057 ||  || — || March 22, 2004 || Anderson Mesa || LONEOS || — || align=right | 1.6 km || 
|-id=058 bgcolor=#E9E9E9
| 184058 ||  || — || March 20, 2004 || Anderson Mesa || LONEOS || — || align=right | 1.0 km || 
|-id=059 bgcolor=#fefefe
| 184059 ||  || — || March 28, 2004 || Kitt Peak || Spacewatch || — || align=right | 1.4 km || 
|-id=060 bgcolor=#E9E9E9
| 184060 ||  || — || March 27, 2004 || Anderson Mesa || LONEOS || GER || align=right | 2.0 km || 
|-id=061 bgcolor=#FA8072
| 184061 ||  || — || March 29, 2004 || Socorro || LINEAR || — || align=right | 1.4 km || 
|-id=062 bgcolor=#fefefe
| 184062 ||  || — || March 17, 2004 || Kitt Peak || Spacewatch || — || align=right data-sort-value="0.79" | 790 m || 
|-id=063 bgcolor=#E9E9E9
| 184063 ||  || — || March 18, 2004 || Kitt Peak || Spacewatch || — || align=right | 2.8 km || 
|-id=064 bgcolor=#E9E9E9
| 184064 Miner || 2004 GM ||  || April 10, 2004 || Wrightwood || J. W. Young || — || align=right | 1.5 km || 
|-id=065 bgcolor=#E9E9E9
| 184065 ||  || — || April 11, 2004 || Palomar || NEAT || — || align=right | 2.2 km || 
|-id=066 bgcolor=#fefefe
| 184066 ||  || — || April 12, 2004 || Anderson Mesa || LONEOS || — || align=right | 1.5 km || 
|-id=067 bgcolor=#E9E9E9
| 184067 ||  || — || April 12, 2004 || Anderson Mesa || LONEOS || — || align=right | 1.1 km || 
|-id=068 bgcolor=#E9E9E9
| 184068 ||  || — || April 12, 2004 || Anderson Mesa || LONEOS || — || align=right | 1.2 km || 
|-id=069 bgcolor=#E9E9E9
| 184069 ||  || — || April 12, 2004 || Kitt Peak || Spacewatch || EUN || align=right | 1.8 km || 
|-id=070 bgcolor=#E9E9E9
| 184070 ||  || — || April 11, 2004 || Palomar || NEAT || — || align=right | 2.8 km || 
|-id=071 bgcolor=#E9E9E9
| 184071 ||  || — || April 10, 2004 || Palomar || NEAT || — || align=right | 1.5 km || 
|-id=072 bgcolor=#E9E9E9
| 184072 ||  || — || April 11, 2004 || Catalina || CSS || — || align=right | 1.6 km || 
|-id=073 bgcolor=#E9E9E9
| 184073 ||  || — || April 14, 2004 || Anderson Mesa || LONEOS || — || align=right | 3.3 km || 
|-id=074 bgcolor=#E9E9E9
| 184074 ||  || — || April 10, 2004 || Palomar || NEAT || — || align=right | 1.7 km || 
|-id=075 bgcolor=#E9E9E9
| 184075 ||  || — || April 10, 2004 || Palomar || NEAT || — || align=right | 4.5 km || 
|-id=076 bgcolor=#E9E9E9
| 184076 ||  || — || April 13, 2004 || Catalina || CSS || CLO || align=right | 3.0 km || 
|-id=077 bgcolor=#E9E9E9
| 184077 ||  || — || April 13, 2004 || Catalina || CSS || — || align=right | 1.5 km || 
|-id=078 bgcolor=#E9E9E9
| 184078 ||  || — || April 14, 2004 || Kitt Peak || Spacewatch || — || align=right | 3.7 km || 
|-id=079 bgcolor=#E9E9E9
| 184079 ||  || — || April 14, 2004 || Palomar || NEAT || — || align=right | 1.9 km || 
|-id=080 bgcolor=#E9E9E9
| 184080 ||  || — || April 12, 2004 || Kitt Peak || Spacewatch || — || align=right | 1.3 km || 
|-id=081 bgcolor=#E9E9E9
| 184081 ||  || — || April 12, 2004 || Kitt Peak || Spacewatch || — || align=right | 3.7 km || 
|-id=082 bgcolor=#E9E9E9
| 184082 ||  || — || April 13, 2004 || Palomar || NEAT || — || align=right | 1.5 km || 
|-id=083 bgcolor=#E9E9E9
| 184083 ||  || — || April 13, 2004 || Palomar || NEAT || — || align=right | 1.5 km || 
|-id=084 bgcolor=#E9E9E9
| 184084 ||  || — || April 15, 2004 || Anderson Mesa || LONEOS || — || align=right | 1.3 km || 
|-id=085 bgcolor=#E9E9E9
| 184085 ||  || — || April 15, 2004 || Siding Spring || SSS || — || align=right | 3.9 km || 
|-id=086 bgcolor=#E9E9E9
| 184086 ||  || — || April 11, 2004 || Palomar || NEAT || — || align=right | 2.8 km || 
|-id=087 bgcolor=#E9E9E9
| 184087 ||  || — || April 13, 2004 || Palomar || NEAT || RAF || align=right | 1.5 km || 
|-id=088 bgcolor=#E9E9E9
| 184088 ||  || — || April 13, 2004 || Kitt Peak || Spacewatch || — || align=right data-sort-value="0.82" | 820 m || 
|-id=089 bgcolor=#E9E9E9
| 184089 ||  || — || April 12, 2004 || Anderson Mesa || LONEOS || — || align=right | 1.4 km || 
|-id=090 bgcolor=#E9E9E9
| 184090 ||  || — || April 13, 2004 || Kitt Peak || Spacewatch || — || align=right | 2.2 km || 
|-id=091 bgcolor=#E9E9E9
| 184091 ||  || — || April 14, 2004 || Kitt Peak || Spacewatch || — || align=right | 2.2 km || 
|-id=092 bgcolor=#E9E9E9
| 184092 ||  || — || April 14, 2004 || Anderson Mesa || LONEOS || — || align=right | 2.4 km || 
|-id=093 bgcolor=#d6d6d6
| 184093 ||  || — || April 13, 2004 || Siding Spring || SSS || — || align=right | 4.6 km || 
|-id=094 bgcolor=#E9E9E9
| 184094 ||  || — || April 13, 2004 || Kitt Peak || Spacewatch || — || align=right | 1.4 km || 
|-id=095 bgcolor=#E9E9E9
| 184095 ||  || — || April 16, 2004 || Anderson Mesa || LONEOS || EUN || align=right | 2.0 km || 
|-id=096 bgcolor=#E9E9E9
| 184096 Kazlauskas ||  ||  || April 16, 2004 || Moletai || K. Černis, J. Zdanavičius || — || align=right | 2.5 km || 
|-id=097 bgcolor=#E9E9E9
| 184097 ||  || — || April 16, 2004 || Socorro || LINEAR || EUN || align=right | 1.8 km || 
|-id=098 bgcolor=#E9E9E9
| 184098 ||  || — || April 16, 2004 || Kitt Peak || Spacewatch || AEO || align=right | 1.6 km || 
|-id=099 bgcolor=#E9E9E9
| 184099 ||  || — || April 17, 2004 || Socorro || LINEAR || — || align=right | 1.8 km || 
|-id=100 bgcolor=#E9E9E9
| 184100 ||  || — || April 17, 2004 || Socorro || LINEAR || — || align=right | 2.7 km || 
|}

184101–184200 

|-bgcolor=#E9E9E9
| 184101 ||  || — || April 19, 2004 || Socorro || LINEAR || — || align=right | 2.0 km || 
|-id=102 bgcolor=#E9E9E9
| 184102 ||  || — || April 19, 2004 || Socorro || LINEAR || — || align=right | 2.9 km || 
|-id=103 bgcolor=#E9E9E9
| 184103 ||  || — || April 17, 2004 || Socorro || LINEAR || — || align=right | 3.6 km || 
|-id=104 bgcolor=#E9E9E9
| 184104 ||  || — || April 16, 2004 || Kitt Peak || Spacewatch || — || align=right | 1.7 km || 
|-id=105 bgcolor=#E9E9E9
| 184105 ||  || — || April 17, 2004 || Socorro || LINEAR || — || align=right | 2.0 km || 
|-id=106 bgcolor=#E9E9E9
| 184106 ||  || — || April 20, 2004 || Socorro || LINEAR || — || align=right | 1.8 km || 
|-id=107 bgcolor=#E9E9E9
| 184107 ||  || — || April 20, 2004 || Socorro || LINEAR || — || align=right | 2.1 km || 
|-id=108 bgcolor=#E9E9E9
| 184108 ||  || — || April 21, 2004 || Socorro || LINEAR || MIS || align=right | 4.0 km || 
|-id=109 bgcolor=#E9E9E9
| 184109 ||  || — || April 21, 2004 || Reedy Creek || J. Broughton || RAF || align=right | 1.4 km || 
|-id=110 bgcolor=#E9E9E9
| 184110 ||  || — || April 20, 2004 || Socorro || LINEAR || — || align=right | 3.1 km || 
|-id=111 bgcolor=#E9E9E9
| 184111 ||  || — || April 23, 2004 || Socorro || LINEAR || — || align=right | 3.1 km || 
|-id=112 bgcolor=#E9E9E9
| 184112 ||  || — || April 20, 2004 || Socorro || LINEAR || — || align=right | 2.2 km || 
|-id=113 bgcolor=#E9E9E9
| 184113 ||  || — || April 21, 2004 || Socorro || LINEAR || — || align=right | 3.4 km || 
|-id=114 bgcolor=#E9E9E9
| 184114 ||  || — || April 22, 2004 || Socorro || LINEAR || — || align=right | 2.1 km || 
|-id=115 bgcolor=#E9E9E9
| 184115 ||  || — || April 23, 2004 || Campo Imperatore || CINEOS || RAF || align=right | 1.6 km || 
|-id=116 bgcolor=#E9E9E9
| 184116 ||  || — || April 21, 2004 || Socorro || LINEAR || — || align=right | 1.9 km || 
|-id=117 bgcolor=#E9E9E9
| 184117 ||  || — || April 26, 2004 || Socorro || LINEAR || — || align=right | 2.7 km || 
|-id=118 bgcolor=#E9E9E9
| 184118 ||  || — || April 22, 2004 || Kitt Peak || Spacewatch || — || align=right | 3.0 km || 
|-id=119 bgcolor=#E9E9E9
| 184119 ||  || — || April 25, 2004 || Socorro || LINEAR || ADE || align=right | 3.2 km || 
|-id=120 bgcolor=#E9E9E9
| 184120 ||  || — || April 25, 2004 || Catalina || CSS || — || align=right | 2.2 km || 
|-id=121 bgcolor=#E9E9E9
| 184121 ||  || — || April 25, 2004 || Socorro || LINEAR || RAF || align=right | 1.4 km || 
|-id=122 bgcolor=#E9E9E9
| 184122 ||  || — || April 30, 2004 || Reedy Creek || J. Broughton || — || align=right | 4.8 km || 
|-id=123 bgcolor=#E9E9E9
| 184123 ||  || — || April 21, 2004 || Kitt Peak || Spacewatch || AEO || align=right | 1.7 km || 
|-id=124 bgcolor=#E9E9E9
| 184124 ||  || — || April 25, 2004 || Kitt Peak || Spacewatch || — || align=right | 1.2 km || 
|-id=125 bgcolor=#E9E9E9
| 184125 ||  || — || April 26, 2004 || Anderson Mesa || LONEOS || — || align=right | 1.8 km || 
|-id=126 bgcolor=#E9E9E9
| 184126 ||  || — || May 9, 2004 || Haleakala || NEAT || — || align=right | 3.0 km || 
|-id=127 bgcolor=#E9E9E9
| 184127 ||  || — || May 11, 2004 || Desert Eagle || W. K. Y. Yeung || GEF || align=right | 2.2 km || 
|-id=128 bgcolor=#E9E9E9
| 184128 ||  || — || May 12, 2004 || Catalina || CSS || — || align=right | 1.9 km || 
|-id=129 bgcolor=#E9E9E9
| 184129 ||  || — || May 13, 2004 || Anderson Mesa || LONEOS || — || align=right | 2.2 km || 
|-id=130 bgcolor=#E9E9E9
| 184130 ||  || — || May 13, 2004 || Reedy Creek || J. Broughton || — || align=right | 2.9 km || 
|-id=131 bgcolor=#E9E9E9
| 184131 ||  || — || May 9, 2004 || Kitt Peak || Spacewatch || — || align=right | 1.4 km || 
|-id=132 bgcolor=#E9E9E9
| 184132 ||  || — || May 9, 2004 || Kitt Peak || Spacewatch || HNS || align=right | 2.0 km || 
|-id=133 bgcolor=#E9E9E9
| 184133 ||  || — || May 9, 2004 || Haleakala || NEAT || — || align=right | 4.3 km || 
|-id=134 bgcolor=#E9E9E9
| 184134 ||  || — || May 10, 2004 || Palomar || NEAT || — || align=right | 1.9 km || 
|-id=135 bgcolor=#E9E9E9
| 184135 ||  || — || May 12, 2004 || Siding Spring || SSS || — || align=right | 4.1 km || 
|-id=136 bgcolor=#E9E9E9
| 184136 ||  || — || May 13, 2004 || Anderson Mesa || LONEOS || — || align=right | 2.6 km || 
|-id=137 bgcolor=#E9E9E9
| 184137 ||  || — || May 13, 2004 || Kitt Peak || Spacewatch || — || align=right | 3.4 km || 
|-id=138 bgcolor=#E9E9E9
| 184138 ||  || — || May 13, 2004 || Palomar || NEAT || — || align=right | 2.7 km || 
|-id=139 bgcolor=#E9E9E9
| 184139 ||  || — || May 14, 2004 || Socorro || LINEAR || — || align=right | 1.5 km || 
|-id=140 bgcolor=#E9E9E9
| 184140 ||  || — || May 10, 2004 || Haleakala || NEAT || MRX || align=right | 1.5 km || 
|-id=141 bgcolor=#E9E9E9
| 184141 ||  || — || May 13, 2004 || Kitt Peak || Spacewatch || MIS || align=right | 3.9 km || 
|-id=142 bgcolor=#E9E9E9
| 184142 ||  || — || May 15, 2004 || Socorro || LINEAR || HNS || align=right | 2.4 km || 
|-id=143 bgcolor=#E9E9E9
| 184143 ||  || — || May 15, 2004 || Socorro || LINEAR || — || align=right | 1.6 km || 
|-id=144 bgcolor=#E9E9E9
| 184144 ||  || — || May 15, 2004 || Socorro || LINEAR || — || align=right | 1.7 km || 
|-id=145 bgcolor=#E9E9E9
| 184145 ||  || — || May 13, 2004 || Anderson Mesa || LONEOS || RAF || align=right | 1.3 km || 
|-id=146 bgcolor=#E9E9E9
| 184146 ||  || — || May 15, 2004 || Socorro || LINEAR || — || align=right | 2.5 km || 
|-id=147 bgcolor=#E9E9E9
| 184147 ||  || — || May 13, 2004 || Kitt Peak || Spacewatch || — || align=right | 2.2 km || 
|-id=148 bgcolor=#E9E9E9
| 184148 ||  || — || May 14, 2004 || Socorro || LINEAR || — || align=right | 1.6 km || 
|-id=149 bgcolor=#E9E9E9
| 184149 ||  || — || May 14, 2004 || Haleakala || NEAT || — || align=right | 2.4 km || 
|-id=150 bgcolor=#E9E9E9
| 184150 ||  || — || May 9, 2004 || Kitt Peak || Spacewatch || — || align=right | 2.7 km || 
|-id=151 bgcolor=#E9E9E9
| 184151 || 2004 KY || — || May 17, 2004 || Reedy Creek || J. Broughton || — || align=right | 1.5 km || 
|-id=152 bgcolor=#d6d6d6
| 184152 ||  || — || May 18, 2004 || Nashville || R. Clingan || — || align=right | 4.2 km || 
|-id=153 bgcolor=#E9E9E9
| 184153 ||  || — || May 16, 2004 || Kitt Peak || Spacewatch || — || align=right | 1.3 km || 
|-id=154 bgcolor=#E9E9E9
| 184154 ||  || — || May 17, 2004 || Socorro || LINEAR || — || align=right | 2.3 km || 
|-id=155 bgcolor=#E9E9E9
| 184155 ||  || — || May 19, 2004 || Socorro || LINEAR || — || align=right | 2.0 km || 
|-id=156 bgcolor=#E9E9E9
| 184156 ||  || — || May 23, 2004 || Catalina || CSS || — || align=right | 4.8 km || 
|-id=157 bgcolor=#E9E9E9
| 184157 ||  || — || May 24, 2004 || Socorro || LINEAR || — || align=right | 2.1 km || 
|-id=158 bgcolor=#E9E9E9
| 184158 ||  || — || May 24, 2004 || Socorro || LINEAR || — || align=right | 3.6 km || 
|-id=159 bgcolor=#E9E9E9
| 184159 || 2004 LW || — || June 5, 2004 || Nogales || Tenagra II Obs. || JUN || align=right | 1.4 km || 
|-id=160 bgcolor=#E9E9E9
| 184160 ||  || — || June 6, 2004 || Catalina || CSS || EUN || align=right | 2.1 km || 
|-id=161 bgcolor=#E9E9E9
| 184161 ||  || — || June 7, 2004 || Catalina || CSS || — || align=right | 1.9 km || 
|-id=162 bgcolor=#E9E9E9
| 184162 ||  || — || June 6, 2004 || Palomar || NEAT || — || align=right | 1.9 km || 
|-id=163 bgcolor=#E9E9E9
| 184163 ||  || — || June 12, 2004 || Kitt Peak || Spacewatch || — || align=right | 2.6 km || 
|-id=164 bgcolor=#E9E9E9
| 184164 ||  || — || June 11, 2004 || Socorro || LINEAR || — || align=right | 2.3 km || 
|-id=165 bgcolor=#E9E9E9
| 184165 ||  || — || June 13, 2004 || Socorro || LINEAR || — || align=right | 2.7 km || 
|-id=166 bgcolor=#E9E9E9
| 184166 ||  || — || June 13, 2004 || Palomar || NEAT || — || align=right | 3.9 km || 
|-id=167 bgcolor=#d6d6d6
| 184167 ||  || — || June 13, 2004 || Catalina || CSS || — || align=right | 4.4 km || 
|-id=168 bgcolor=#E9E9E9
| 184168 ||  || — || June 13, 2004 || Catalina || CSS || — || align=right | 5.0 km || 
|-id=169 bgcolor=#d6d6d6
| 184169 ||  || — || June 13, 2004 || Palomar || NEAT || — || align=right | 7.2 km || 
|-id=170 bgcolor=#E9E9E9
| 184170 ||  || — || June 18, 2004 || Reedy Creek || J. Broughton || — || align=right | 3.5 km || 
|-id=171 bgcolor=#E9E9E9
| 184171 ||  || — || June 17, 2004 || Palomar || NEAT || — || align=right | 1.8 km || 
|-id=172 bgcolor=#E9E9E9
| 184172 ||  || — || July 14, 2004 || Socorro || LINEAR || — || align=right | 4.0 km || 
|-id=173 bgcolor=#E9E9E9
| 184173 ||  || — || July 14, 2004 || Socorro || LINEAR || — || align=right | 3.6 km || 
|-id=174 bgcolor=#d6d6d6
| 184174 ||  || — || July 11, 2004 || Socorro || LINEAR || — || align=right | 3.6 km || 
|-id=175 bgcolor=#d6d6d6
| 184175 ||  || — || July 14, 2004 || Socorro || LINEAR || — || align=right | 4.5 km || 
|-id=176 bgcolor=#E9E9E9
| 184176 ||  || — || July 13, 2004 || Siding Spring || SSS || JUN || align=right | 1.9 km || 
|-id=177 bgcolor=#d6d6d6
| 184177 ||  || — || July 9, 2004 || Anderson Mesa || LONEOS || — || align=right | 3.9 km || 
|-id=178 bgcolor=#d6d6d6
| 184178 ||  || — || July 15, 2004 || Siding Spring || SSS || EOS || align=right | 2.6 km || 
|-id=179 bgcolor=#d6d6d6
| 184179 ||  || — || July 11, 2004 || Socorro || LINEAR || URS || align=right | 5.1 km || 
|-id=180 bgcolor=#d6d6d6
| 184180 ||  || — || July 15, 2004 || Siding Spring || SSS || URS || align=right | 6.3 km || 
|-id=181 bgcolor=#d6d6d6
| 184181 || 2004 OO || — || July 17, 2004 || 7300 Observatory || W. K. Y. Yeung || — || align=right | 3.2 km || 
|-id=182 bgcolor=#d6d6d6
| 184182 ||  || — || July 17, 2004 || Socorro || LINEAR || HYG || align=right | 5.0 km || 
|-id=183 bgcolor=#E9E9E9
| 184183 ||  || — || July 16, 2004 || Socorro || LINEAR || — || align=right | 3.9 km || 
|-id=184 bgcolor=#d6d6d6
| 184184 ||  || — || July 27, 2004 || Socorro || LINEAR || — || align=right | 3.3 km || 
|-id=185 bgcolor=#d6d6d6
| 184185 || 2004 PX || — || August 6, 2004 || Palomar || NEAT || EOS || align=right | 5.4 km || 
|-id=186 bgcolor=#d6d6d6
| 184186 ||  || — || August 6, 2004 || Reedy Creek || J. Broughton || — || align=right | 4.6 km || 
|-id=187 bgcolor=#d6d6d6
| 184187 ||  || — || August 3, 2004 || Siding Spring || SSS || CHA || align=right | 3.7 km || 
|-id=188 bgcolor=#d6d6d6
| 184188 ||  || — || August 8, 2004 || Socorro || LINEAR || — || align=right | 3.5 km || 
|-id=189 bgcolor=#d6d6d6
| 184189 ||  || — || August 8, 2004 || Anderson Mesa || LONEOS || HYG || align=right | 5.0 km || 
|-id=190 bgcolor=#d6d6d6
| 184190 ||  || — || August 8, 2004 || Palomar || NEAT || — || align=right | 4.5 km || 
|-id=191 bgcolor=#d6d6d6
| 184191 ||  || — || August 8, 2004 || Socorro || LINEAR || — || align=right | 3.8 km || 
|-id=192 bgcolor=#d6d6d6
| 184192 ||  || — || August 8, 2004 || Campo Imperatore || CINEOS || — || align=right | 4.4 km || 
|-id=193 bgcolor=#d6d6d6
| 184193 ||  || — || August 8, 2004 || Socorro || LINEAR || 7:4 || align=right | 6.4 km || 
|-id=194 bgcolor=#d6d6d6
| 184194 ||  || — || August 8, 2004 || Socorro || LINEAR || — || align=right | 4.5 km || 
|-id=195 bgcolor=#d6d6d6
| 184195 ||  || — || August 8, 2004 || Anderson Mesa || LONEOS || — || align=right | 3.2 km || 
|-id=196 bgcolor=#d6d6d6
| 184196 ||  || — || August 9, 2004 || Campo Imperatore || CINEOS || TIR || align=right | 4.2 km || 
|-id=197 bgcolor=#d6d6d6
| 184197 ||  || — || August 8, 2004 || Socorro || LINEAR || — || align=right | 4.2 km || 
|-id=198 bgcolor=#d6d6d6
| 184198 ||  || — || August 8, 2004 || Palomar || NEAT || — || align=right | 3.4 km || 
|-id=199 bgcolor=#d6d6d6
| 184199 ||  || — || August 10, 2004 || Socorro || LINEAR || — || align=right | 3.0 km || 
|-id=200 bgcolor=#d6d6d6
| 184200 ||  || — || August 6, 2004 || Palomar || NEAT || HYG || align=right | 2.9 km || 
|}

184201–184300 

|-bgcolor=#E9E9E9
| 184201 ||  || — || August 8, 2004 || Socorro || LINEAR || — || align=right | 2.5 km || 
|-id=202 bgcolor=#d6d6d6
| 184202 ||  || — || August 8, 2004 || Socorro || LINEAR || — || align=right | 4.2 km || 
|-id=203 bgcolor=#d6d6d6
| 184203 ||  || — || August 8, 2004 || Anderson Mesa || LONEOS || THM || align=right | 3.0 km || 
|-id=204 bgcolor=#d6d6d6
| 184204 ||  || — || August 8, 2004 || Campo Imperatore || CINEOS || ALA || align=right | 7.1 km || 
|-id=205 bgcolor=#E9E9E9
| 184205 ||  || — || August 10, 2004 || Socorro || LINEAR || DOR || align=right | 4.0 km || 
|-id=206 bgcolor=#d6d6d6
| 184206 ||  || — || August 10, 2004 || Socorro || LINEAR || EOS || align=right | 3.8 km || 
|-id=207 bgcolor=#d6d6d6
| 184207 ||  || — || August 7, 2004 || Campo Imperatore || CINEOS || — || align=right | 3.1 km || 
|-id=208 bgcolor=#d6d6d6
| 184208 ||  || — || August 10, 2004 || Anderson Mesa || LONEOS || HYG || align=right | 6.5 km || 
|-id=209 bgcolor=#d6d6d6
| 184209 ||  || — || August 8, 2004 || Palomar || NEAT || — || align=right | 5.9 km || 
|-id=210 bgcolor=#d6d6d6
| 184210 ||  || — || August 15, 2004 || Palomar || NEAT || TIR || align=right | 3.8 km || 
|-id=211 bgcolor=#d6d6d6
| 184211 ||  || — || August 15, 2004 || Siding Spring || SSS || — || align=right | 7.4 km || 
|-id=212 bgcolor=#C2E0FF
| 184212 ||  || — || August 13, 2004 || Cerro Tololo || M. W. Buie || SDO || align=right | 154 km || 
|-id=213 bgcolor=#d6d6d6
| 184213 ||  || — || August 8, 2004 || Palomar || NEAT || EOS || align=right | 3.5 km || 
|-id=214 bgcolor=#d6d6d6
| 184214 ||  || — || August 21, 2004 || Catalina || CSS || — || align=right | 4.7 km || 
|-id=215 bgcolor=#d6d6d6
| 184215 ||  || — || August 21, 2004 || Siding Spring || SSS || — || align=right | 5.7 km || 
|-id=216 bgcolor=#E9E9E9
| 184216 ||  || — || August 22, 2004 || Kitt Peak || Spacewatch || — || align=right | 2.2 km || 
|-id=217 bgcolor=#d6d6d6
| 184217 ||  || — || September 7, 2004 || Kitt Peak || Spacewatch || — || align=right | 5.3 km || 
|-id=218 bgcolor=#d6d6d6
| 184218 ||  || — || September 7, 2004 || Socorro || LINEAR || — || align=right | 4.6 km || 
|-id=219 bgcolor=#d6d6d6
| 184219 ||  || — || September 8, 2004 || Socorro || LINEAR || — || align=right | 5.7 km || 
|-id=220 bgcolor=#d6d6d6
| 184220 ||  || — || September 8, 2004 || Socorro || LINEAR || — || align=right | 3.6 km || 
|-id=221 bgcolor=#d6d6d6
| 184221 ||  || — || September 8, 2004 || Socorro || LINEAR || LIX || align=right | 6.8 km || 
|-id=222 bgcolor=#d6d6d6
| 184222 ||  || — || September 8, 2004 || Socorro || LINEAR || — || align=right | 3.8 km || 
|-id=223 bgcolor=#d6d6d6
| 184223 ||  || — || September 8, 2004 || Socorro || LINEAR || — || align=right | 3.7 km || 
|-id=224 bgcolor=#d6d6d6
| 184224 ||  || — || September 8, 2004 || Socorro || LINEAR || — || align=right | 3.8 km || 
|-id=225 bgcolor=#d6d6d6
| 184225 ||  || — || September 8, 2004 || Socorro || LINEAR || HIL3:2 || align=right | 9.8 km || 
|-id=226 bgcolor=#d6d6d6
| 184226 ||  || — || September 8, 2004 || Socorro || LINEAR || — || align=right | 5.4 km || 
|-id=227 bgcolor=#d6d6d6
| 184227 ||  || — || September 8, 2004 || Socorro || LINEAR || ELF || align=right | 6.0 km || 
|-id=228 bgcolor=#d6d6d6
| 184228 ||  || — || September 8, 2004 || Socorro || LINEAR || EOS || align=right | 2.9 km || 
|-id=229 bgcolor=#d6d6d6
| 184229 ||  || — || September 8, 2004 || Socorro || LINEAR || — || align=right | 5.4 km || 
|-id=230 bgcolor=#d6d6d6
| 184230 ||  || — || September 7, 2004 || Palomar || NEAT || — || align=right | 5.9 km || 
|-id=231 bgcolor=#d6d6d6
| 184231 ||  || — || September 9, 2004 || Socorro || LINEAR || — || align=right | 3.5 km || 
|-id=232 bgcolor=#d6d6d6
| 184232 ||  || — || September 9, 2004 || Socorro || LINEAR || — || align=right | 4.5 km || 
|-id=233 bgcolor=#d6d6d6
| 184233 ||  || — || September 9, 2004 || Socorro || LINEAR || — || align=right | 5.8 km || 
|-id=234 bgcolor=#d6d6d6
| 184234 ||  || — || September 10, 2004 || Socorro || LINEAR || — || align=right | 3.6 km || 
|-id=235 bgcolor=#d6d6d6
| 184235 ||  || — || September 10, 2004 || Socorro || LINEAR || HYG || align=right | 4.4 km || 
|-id=236 bgcolor=#d6d6d6
| 184236 ||  || — || September 10, 2004 || Socorro || LINEAR || HYG || align=right | 4.3 km || 
|-id=237 bgcolor=#d6d6d6
| 184237 ||  || — || September 11, 2004 || Socorro || LINEAR || — || align=right | 3.4 km || 
|-id=238 bgcolor=#d6d6d6
| 184238 ||  || — || September 11, 2004 || Socorro || LINEAR || — || align=right | 4.2 km || 
|-id=239 bgcolor=#d6d6d6
| 184239 ||  || — || September 9, 2004 || Kitt Peak || Spacewatch || HYG || align=right | 4.8 km || 
|-id=240 bgcolor=#d6d6d6
| 184240 ||  || — || September 9, 2004 || Kitt Peak || Spacewatch || — || align=right | 4.9 km || 
|-id=241 bgcolor=#d6d6d6
| 184241 ||  || — || September 10, 2004 || Socorro || LINEAR || HIL3:2 || align=right | 9.4 km || 
|-id=242 bgcolor=#d6d6d6
| 184242 ||  || — || September 10, 2004 || Kitt Peak || Spacewatch || HYG || align=right | 3.5 km || 
|-id=243 bgcolor=#d6d6d6
| 184243 ||  || — || September 6, 2004 || Palomar || NEAT || HYG || align=right | 6.0 km || 
|-id=244 bgcolor=#d6d6d6
| 184244 ||  || — || September 9, 2004 || Socorro || LINEAR || — || align=right | 4.3 km || 
|-id=245 bgcolor=#d6d6d6
| 184245 ||  || — || September 15, 2004 || Siding Spring || SSS || — || align=right | 7.2 km || 
|-id=246 bgcolor=#d6d6d6
| 184246 ||  || — || September 15, 2004 || Anderson Mesa || LONEOS || HYG || align=right | 5.3 km || 
|-id=247 bgcolor=#d6d6d6
| 184247 ||  || — || September 15, 2004 || Anderson Mesa || LONEOS || HYG || align=right | 5.3 km || 
|-id=248 bgcolor=#d6d6d6
| 184248 ||  || — || September 16, 2004 || Siding Spring || SSS || — || align=right | 4.6 km || 
|-id=249 bgcolor=#d6d6d6
| 184249 ||  || — || September 17, 2004 || Socorro || LINEAR || — || align=right | 4.3 km || 
|-id=250 bgcolor=#d6d6d6
| 184250 ||  || — || September 17, 2004 || Socorro || LINEAR || — || align=right | 3.8 km || 
|-id=251 bgcolor=#d6d6d6
| 184251 ||  || — || September 18, 2004 || Socorro || LINEAR || 7:4 || align=right | 6.2 km || 
|-id=252 bgcolor=#d6d6d6
| 184252 ||  || — || October 5, 2004 || Kitt Peak || Spacewatch || THM || align=right | 2.9 km || 
|-id=253 bgcolor=#d6d6d6
| 184253 ||  || — || October 5, 2004 || Socorro || LINEAR || TIR || align=right | 5.1 km || 
|-id=254 bgcolor=#d6d6d6
| 184254 ||  || — || October 8, 2004 || Palomar || NEAT || — || align=right | 5.7 km || 
|-id=255 bgcolor=#d6d6d6
| 184255 ||  || — || October 5, 2004 || Anderson Mesa || LONEOS || THM || align=right | 3.7 km || 
|-id=256 bgcolor=#d6d6d6
| 184256 ||  || — || October 5, 2004 || Anderson Mesa || LONEOS || 3:2 || align=right | 7.1 km || 
|-id=257 bgcolor=#d6d6d6
| 184257 ||  || — || October 5, 2004 || Kitt Peak || Spacewatch || 3:2 || align=right | 5.1 km || 
|-id=258 bgcolor=#d6d6d6
| 184258 ||  || — || October 7, 2004 || Socorro || LINEAR || — || align=right | 4.2 km || 
|-id=259 bgcolor=#E9E9E9
| 184259 ||  || — || October 5, 2004 || Socorro || LINEAR || — || align=right | 4.8 km || 
|-id=260 bgcolor=#d6d6d6
| 184260 ||  || — || October 7, 2004 || Socorro || LINEAR || HYG || align=right | 4.5 km || 
|-id=261 bgcolor=#d6d6d6
| 184261 ||  || — || October 7, 2004 || Socorro || LINEAR || — || align=right | 4.3 km || 
|-id=262 bgcolor=#d6d6d6
| 184262 ||  || — || October 6, 2004 || Kitt Peak || Spacewatch || 3:2 || align=right | 5.4 km || 
|-id=263 bgcolor=#E9E9E9
| 184263 ||  || — || October 7, 2004 || Kitt Peak || Spacewatch || — || align=right | 1.5 km || 
|-id=264 bgcolor=#d6d6d6
| 184264 ||  || — || October 9, 2004 || Kitt Peak || Spacewatch || — || align=right | 4.3 km || 
|-id=265 bgcolor=#fefefe
| 184265 ||  || — || October 21, 2004 || Socorro || LINEAR || — || align=right | 1.1 km || 
|-id=266 bgcolor=#FFC2E0
| 184266 ||  || — || November 3, 2004 || Anderson Mesa || LONEOS || APOPHAcritical || align=right data-sort-value="0.47" | 470 m || 
|-id=267 bgcolor=#fefefe
| 184267 || 2004 XD || — || December 1, 2004 || Socorro || LINEAR || H || align=right data-sort-value="0.92" | 920 m || 
|-id=268 bgcolor=#fefefe
| 184268 ||  || — || December 7, 2004 || Socorro || LINEAR || H || align=right | 1.0 km || 
|-id=269 bgcolor=#fefefe
| 184269 ||  || — || December 3, 2004 || Kitt Peak || Spacewatch || NYS || align=right | 1.1 km || 
|-id=270 bgcolor=#fefefe
| 184270 ||  || — || December 9, 2004 || Bergisch Gladbach || W. Bickel || — || align=right | 1.0 km || 
|-id=271 bgcolor=#fefefe
| 184271 ||  || — || December 11, 2004 || Kitt Peak || Spacewatch || — || align=right | 1.3 km || 
|-id=272 bgcolor=#fefefe
| 184272 ||  || — || December 10, 2004 || Campo Imperatore || CINEOS || — || align=right | 1.1 km || 
|-id=273 bgcolor=#E9E9E9
| 184273 ||  || — || December 11, 2004 || Kitt Peak || Spacewatch || — || align=right | 3.7 km || 
|-id=274 bgcolor=#C2FFFF
| 184274 ||  || — || December 18, 2004 || Mount Lemmon || Mount Lemmon Survey || L5 || align=right | 12 km || 
|-id=275 bgcolor=#fefefe
| 184275 Laffra || 2005 AX ||  || January 6, 2005 || Nogales || J.-C. Merlin || H || align=right data-sort-value="0.78" | 780 m || 
|-id=276 bgcolor=#C2FFFF
| 184276 ||  || — || January 6, 2005 || Catalina || CSS || L5 || align=right | 15 km || 
|-id=277 bgcolor=#fefefe
| 184277 ||  || — || January 6, 2005 || Socorro || LINEAR || — || align=right | 1.4 km || 
|-id=278 bgcolor=#fefefe
| 184278 ||  || — || January 11, 2005 || Socorro || LINEAR || NYS || align=right | 1.1 km || 
|-id=279 bgcolor=#fefefe
| 184279 ||  || — || January 15, 2005 || Catalina || CSS || H || align=right | 1.2 km || 
|-id=280 bgcolor=#C2FFFF
| 184280 Yperion ||  ||  || January 13, 2005 || Jarnac || Jarnac Obs. || L5 || align=right | 9.8 km || 
|-id=281 bgcolor=#fefefe
| 184281 ||  || — || January 15, 2005 || Socorro || LINEAR || — || align=right | 1.00 km || 
|-id=282 bgcolor=#fefefe
| 184282 ||  || — || January 19, 2005 || Goodricke-Pigott || R. A. Tucker || H || align=right | 1.3 km || 
|-id=283 bgcolor=#fefefe
| 184283 ||  || — || January 16, 2005 || Catalina || CSS || H || align=right | 1.1 km || 
|-id=284 bgcolor=#C2FFFF
| 184284 ||  || — || January 17, 2005 || Kitt Peak || Spacewatch || L5 || align=right | 12 km || 
|-id=285 bgcolor=#fefefe
| 184285 ||  || — || February 4, 2005 || Socorro || LINEAR || H || align=right | 1.1 km || 
|-id=286 bgcolor=#fefefe
| 184286 ||  || — || February 2, 2005 || Kitt Peak || Spacewatch || MAS || align=right | 1.1 km || 
|-id=287 bgcolor=#C2FFFF
| 184287 ||  || — || February 2, 2005 || Socorro || LINEAR || L5 || align=right | 13 km || 
|-id=288 bgcolor=#E9E9E9
| 184288 ||  || — || February 4, 2005 || Palomar || NEAT || — || align=right | 3.0 km || 
|-id=289 bgcolor=#fefefe
| 184289 ||  || — || February 1, 2005 || Kitt Peak || Spacewatch || — || align=right | 1.1 km || 
|-id=290 bgcolor=#fefefe
| 184290 ||  || — || February 9, 2005 || La Silla || A. Boattini, H. Scholl || NYS || align=right data-sort-value="0.91" | 910 m || 
|-id=291 bgcolor=#fefefe
| 184291 ||  || — || February 15, 2005 || RAS || A. Lowe || — || align=right | 1.1 km || 
|-id=292 bgcolor=#E9E9E9
| 184292 || 2005 EK || — || March 1, 2005 || Kitt Peak || Spacewatch || — || align=right | 1.8 km || 
|-id=293 bgcolor=#fefefe
| 184293 ||  || — || March 2, 2005 || Socorro || LINEAR || H || align=right | 1.1 km || 
|-id=294 bgcolor=#fefefe
| 184294 ||  || — || March 3, 2005 || Catalina || CSS || — || align=right data-sort-value="0.95" | 950 m || 
|-id=295 bgcolor=#fefefe
| 184295 ||  || — || March 4, 2005 || Mount Lemmon || Mount Lemmon Survey || — || align=right | 1.2 km || 
|-id=296 bgcolor=#fefefe
| 184296 ||  || — || March 1, 2005 || Catalina || CSS || H || align=right data-sort-value="0.98" | 980 m || 
|-id=297 bgcolor=#fefefe
| 184297 ||  || — || March 3, 2005 || Kitt Peak || Spacewatch || NYS || align=right data-sort-value="0.71" | 710 m || 
|-id=298 bgcolor=#fefefe
| 184298 ||  || — || March 4, 2005 || Catalina || CSS || NYS || align=right data-sort-value="0.95" | 950 m || 
|-id=299 bgcolor=#E9E9E9
| 184299 ||  || — || March 3, 2005 || Catalina || CSS || — || align=right | 4.3 km || 
|-id=300 bgcolor=#fefefe
| 184300 ||  || — || March 4, 2005 || Mount Lemmon || Mount Lemmon Survey || — || align=right data-sort-value="0.84" | 840 m || 
|}

184301–184400 

|-bgcolor=#fefefe
| 184301 ||  || — || March 9, 2005 || Socorro || LINEAR || H || align=right data-sort-value="0.86" | 860 m || 
|-id=302 bgcolor=#E9E9E9
| 184302 ||  || — || March 9, 2005 || Kitt Peak || Spacewatch || — || align=right | 2.2 km || 
|-id=303 bgcolor=#fefefe
| 184303 ||  || — || March 9, 2005 || Catalina || CSS || — || align=right | 2.5 km || 
|-id=304 bgcolor=#fefefe
| 184304 ||  || — || March 11, 2005 || Mount Lemmon || Mount Lemmon Survey || — || align=right data-sort-value="0.88" | 880 m || 
|-id=305 bgcolor=#fefefe
| 184305 ||  || — || March 12, 2005 || Kitt Peak || Spacewatch || NYS || align=right data-sort-value="0.92" | 920 m || 
|-id=306 bgcolor=#C2FFFF
| 184306 ||  || — || March 11, 2005 || Kitt Peak || Spacewatch || L5 || align=right | 13 km || 
|-id=307 bgcolor=#fefefe
| 184307 ||  || — || March 13, 2005 || Catalina || CSS || — || align=right | 1.3 km || 
|-id=308 bgcolor=#E9E9E9
| 184308 ||  || — || March 4, 2005 || Kitt Peak || Spacewatch || HEN || align=right | 1.5 km || 
|-id=309 bgcolor=#fefefe
| 184309 ||  || — || March 11, 2005 || Kitt Peak || Spacewatch || NYS || align=right data-sort-value="0.84" | 840 m || 
|-id=310 bgcolor=#fefefe
| 184310 ||  || — || March 13, 2005 || Kitt Peak || Spacewatch || — || align=right data-sort-value="0.91" | 910 m || 
|-id=311 bgcolor=#fefefe
| 184311 ||  || — || March 10, 2005 || Anderson Mesa || LONEOS || FLO || align=right data-sort-value="0.91" | 910 m || 
|-id=312 bgcolor=#fefefe
| 184312 ||  || — || March 9, 2005 || Catalina || CSS || H || align=right data-sort-value="0.81" | 810 m || 
|-id=313 bgcolor=#fefefe
| 184313 ||  || — || March 11, 2005 || Catalina || CSS || V || align=right | 1.2 km || 
|-id=314 bgcolor=#C2E0FF
| 184314 Mbabamwanawaresa ||  ||  || March 11, 2005 || Kitt Peak || M. W. Buie || cubewano (hot)critical || align=right | 233 km || 
|-id=315 bgcolor=#fefefe
| 184315 ||  || — || March 10, 2005 || Kitt Peak || M. W. Buie || MAS || align=right | 1.2 km || 
|-id=316 bgcolor=#E9E9E9
| 184316 ||  || — || March 11, 2005 || Kitt Peak || Spacewatch || HEN || align=right | 1.5 km || 
|-id=317 bgcolor=#fefefe
| 184317 ||  || — || March 4, 2005 || Jarnac || Jarnac Obs. || — || align=right | 1.2 km || 
|-id=318 bgcolor=#E9E9E9
| 184318 Fosanelli ||  ||  || April 2, 2005 || Ottmarsheim || C. Rinner || — || align=right | 2.5 km || 
|-id=319 bgcolor=#E9E9E9
| 184319 ||  || — || April 1, 2005 || Catalina || CSS || — || align=right | 2.7 km || 
|-id=320 bgcolor=#fefefe
| 184320 ||  || — || April 1, 2005 || Anderson Mesa || LONEOS || — || align=right data-sort-value="0.98" | 980 m || 
|-id=321 bgcolor=#fefefe
| 184321 ||  || — || April 2, 2005 || Mount Lemmon || Mount Lemmon Survey || FLO || align=right | 1.2 km || 
|-id=322 bgcolor=#E9E9E9
| 184322 ||  || — || April 4, 2005 || Catalina || CSS || — || align=right | 4.5 km || 
|-id=323 bgcolor=#fefefe
| 184323 ||  || — || April 4, 2005 || Mount Lemmon || Mount Lemmon Survey || MAS || align=right data-sort-value="0.89" | 890 m || 
|-id=324 bgcolor=#fefefe
| 184324 ||  || — || April 4, 2005 || Socorro || LINEAR || EUT || align=right | 1.1 km || 
|-id=325 bgcolor=#fefefe
| 184325 ||  || — || April 6, 2005 || Jarnac || Jarnac Obs. || V || align=right data-sort-value="0.82" | 820 m || 
|-id=326 bgcolor=#fefefe
| 184326 ||  || — || April 4, 2005 || Catalina || CSS || — || align=right | 1.1 km || 
|-id=327 bgcolor=#E9E9E9
| 184327 ||  || — || April 8, 2005 || Socorro || LINEAR || — || align=right | 3.3 km || 
|-id=328 bgcolor=#fefefe
| 184328 ||  || — || April 6, 2005 || Kitt Peak || Spacewatch || FLO || align=right data-sort-value="0.81" | 810 m || 
|-id=329 bgcolor=#fefefe
| 184329 ||  || — || April 6, 2005 || Mount Lemmon || Mount Lemmon Survey || — || align=right | 1.1 km || 
|-id=330 bgcolor=#E9E9E9
| 184330 ||  || — || April 7, 2005 || Kitt Peak || Spacewatch || — || align=right | 3.2 km || 
|-id=331 bgcolor=#fefefe
| 184331 ||  || — || April 9, 2005 || Socorro || LINEAR || — || align=right data-sort-value="0.99" | 990 m || 
|-id=332 bgcolor=#E9E9E9
| 184332 ||  || — || April 9, 2005 || Kitt Peak || Spacewatch || — || align=right | 3.0 km || 
|-id=333 bgcolor=#fefefe
| 184333 ||  || — || April 10, 2005 || Mount Lemmon || Mount Lemmon Survey || — || align=right | 1.2 km || 
|-id=334 bgcolor=#E9E9E9
| 184334 ||  || — || April 9, 2005 || Socorro || LINEAR || MAR || align=right | 2.3 km || 
|-id=335 bgcolor=#fefefe
| 184335 ||  || — || April 10, 2005 || Kitt Peak || Spacewatch || — || align=right data-sort-value="0.81" | 810 m || 
|-id=336 bgcolor=#fefefe
| 184336 ||  || — || April 12, 2005 || Kitt Peak || Spacewatch || FLO || align=right data-sort-value="0.88" | 880 m || 
|-id=337 bgcolor=#fefefe
| 184337 ||  || — || April 10, 2005 || Kitt Peak || Spacewatch || — || align=right | 1.2 km || 
|-id=338 bgcolor=#fefefe
| 184338 ||  || — || April 11, 2005 || Kitt Peak || Spacewatch || — || align=right | 1.2 km || 
|-id=339 bgcolor=#fefefe
| 184339 ||  || — || April 14, 2005 || Kitt Peak || Spacewatch || FLO || align=right | 1.1 km || 
|-id=340 bgcolor=#E9E9E9
| 184340 ||  || — || April 10, 2005 || Mount Lemmon || Mount Lemmon Survey || — || align=right | 1.1 km || 
|-id=341 bgcolor=#FA8072
| 184341 ||  || — || April 15, 2005 || Kitt Peak || Spacewatch || — || align=right data-sort-value="0.91" | 910 m || 
|-id=342 bgcolor=#fefefe
| 184342 ||  || — || April 15, 2005 || Kitt Peak || Spacewatch || — || align=right | 1.2 km || 
|-id=343 bgcolor=#fefefe
| 184343 ||  || — || April 2, 2005 || Mount Lemmon || Mount Lemmon Survey || MAS || align=right data-sort-value="0.87" | 870 m || 
|-id=344 bgcolor=#fefefe
| 184344 ||  || — || April 17, 2005 || Kitt Peak || Spacewatch || MAS || align=right data-sort-value="0.96" | 960 m || 
|-id=345 bgcolor=#fefefe
| 184345 ||  || — || April 27, 2005 || Campo Imperatore || CINEOS || — || align=right | 1.1 km || 
|-id=346 bgcolor=#FA8072
| 184346 ||  || — || April 30, 2005 || Kitt Peak || Spacewatch || — || align=right | 2.7 km || 
|-id=347 bgcolor=#fefefe
| 184347 ||  || — || April 30, 2005 || Kitt Peak || Spacewatch || — || align=right | 1.1 km || 
|-id=348 bgcolor=#fefefe
| 184348 ||  || — || April 30, 2005 || Palomar || NEAT || FLO || align=right data-sort-value="0.84" | 840 m || 
|-id=349 bgcolor=#fefefe
| 184349 || 2005 JV || — || May 3, 2005 || Socorro || LINEAR || — || align=right | 1.0 km || 
|-id=350 bgcolor=#fefefe
| 184350 ||  || — || May 3, 2005 || Kitt Peak || Spacewatch || — || align=right | 1.3 km || 
|-id=351 bgcolor=#fefefe
| 184351 ||  || — || May 4, 2005 || Mauna Kea || C. Veillet || FLO || align=right data-sort-value="0.80" | 800 m || 
|-id=352 bgcolor=#E9E9E9
| 184352 ||  || — || May 3, 2005 || Kitt Peak || Spacewatch || — || align=right | 1.5 km || 
|-id=353 bgcolor=#fefefe
| 184353 ||  || — || May 8, 2005 || RAS || A. Lowe || — || align=right | 1.3 km || 
|-id=354 bgcolor=#fefefe
| 184354 ||  || — || May 4, 2005 || Kitt Peak || Spacewatch || — || align=right | 1.2 km || 
|-id=355 bgcolor=#fefefe
| 184355 ||  || — || May 7, 2005 || Kitt Peak || Spacewatch || — || align=right data-sort-value="0.93" | 930 m || 
|-id=356 bgcolor=#d6d6d6
| 184356 ||  || — || May 4, 2005 || Kitt Peak || Spacewatch || — || align=right | 3.4 km || 
|-id=357 bgcolor=#fefefe
| 184357 ||  || — || May 4, 2005 || Kitt Peak || Spacewatch || — || align=right data-sort-value="0.97" | 970 m || 
|-id=358 bgcolor=#fefefe
| 184358 ||  || — || May 4, 2005 || Palomar || NEAT || — || align=right | 1.2 km || 
|-id=359 bgcolor=#fefefe
| 184359 ||  || — || May 4, 2005 || Siding Spring || SSS || — || align=right | 1.3 km || 
|-id=360 bgcolor=#fefefe
| 184360 ||  || — || May 4, 2005 || Siding Spring || SSS || FLO || align=right data-sort-value="0.82" | 820 m || 
|-id=361 bgcolor=#fefefe
| 184361 ||  || — || May 9, 2005 || Mount Lemmon || Mount Lemmon Survey || — || align=right | 1.1 km || 
|-id=362 bgcolor=#fefefe
| 184362 ||  || — || May 11, 2005 || Palomar || NEAT || — || align=right | 1.0 km || 
|-id=363 bgcolor=#fefefe
| 184363 ||  || — || May 9, 2005 || Kitt Peak || Spacewatch || V || align=right data-sort-value="0.88" | 880 m || 
|-id=364 bgcolor=#E9E9E9
| 184364 ||  || — || May 9, 2005 || Kitt Peak || Spacewatch || — || align=right | 2.0 km || 
|-id=365 bgcolor=#E9E9E9
| 184365 ||  || — || May 10, 2005 || Catalina || CSS || — || align=right | 1.5 km || 
|-id=366 bgcolor=#fefefe
| 184366 ||  || — || May 12, 2005 || Kitt Peak || Spacewatch || FLO || align=right data-sort-value="0.81" | 810 m || 
|-id=367 bgcolor=#fefefe
| 184367 ||  || — || May 8, 2005 || Kitt Peak || Spacewatch || — || align=right data-sort-value="0.77" | 770 m || 
|-id=368 bgcolor=#fefefe
| 184368 ||  || — || May 10, 2005 || Kitt Peak || Spacewatch || FLO || align=right data-sort-value="0.93" | 930 m || 
|-id=369 bgcolor=#E9E9E9
| 184369 ||  || — || May 14, 2005 || Mount Lemmon || Mount Lemmon Survey || — || align=right | 1.6 km || 
|-id=370 bgcolor=#E9E9E9
| 184370 ||  || — || May 15, 2005 || Mount Lemmon || Mount Lemmon Survey || HOF || align=right | 4.8 km || 
|-id=371 bgcolor=#d6d6d6
| 184371 ||  || — || May 4, 2005 || Mount Lemmon || Mount Lemmon Survey || — || align=right | 3.7 km || 
|-id=372 bgcolor=#fefefe
| 184372 ||  || — || May 7, 2005 || Mount Lemmon || Mount Lemmon Survey || MAS || align=right data-sort-value="0.72" | 720 m || 
|-id=373 bgcolor=#fefefe
| 184373 ||  || — || May 8, 2005 || Mount Lemmon || Mount Lemmon Survey || — || align=right data-sort-value="0.85" | 850 m || 
|-id=374 bgcolor=#fefefe
| 184374 ||  || — || May 17, 2005 || Mount Lemmon || Mount Lemmon Survey || — || align=right | 1.1 km || 
|-id=375 bgcolor=#fefefe
| 184375 ||  || — || May 19, 2005 || Mount Lemmon || Mount Lemmon Survey || — || align=right | 1.2 km || 
|-id=376 bgcolor=#fefefe
| 184376 ||  || — || May 28, 2005 || Reedy Creek || J. Broughton || — || align=right | 1.2 km || 
|-id=377 bgcolor=#fefefe
| 184377 ||  || — || May 29, 2005 || Siding Spring || SSS || — || align=right data-sort-value="0.94" | 940 m || 
|-id=378 bgcolor=#fefefe
| 184378 ||  || — || May 30, 2005 || Siding Spring || SSS || — || align=right | 1.1 km || 
|-id=379 bgcolor=#fefefe
| 184379 ||  || — || June 3, 2005 || Reedy Creek || J. Broughton || — || align=right | 1.2 km || 
|-id=380 bgcolor=#fefefe
| 184380 ||  || — || June 4, 2005 || Reedy Creek || J. Broughton || — || align=right | 1.3 km || 
|-id=381 bgcolor=#fefefe
| 184381 ||  || — || June 1, 2005 || Kitt Peak || Spacewatch || — || align=right | 1.0 km || 
|-id=382 bgcolor=#fefefe
| 184382 ||  || — || June 5, 2005 || Kitt Peak || Spacewatch || — || align=right | 1.1 km || 
|-id=383 bgcolor=#fefefe
| 184383 ||  || — || June 6, 2005 || Kitt Peak || Spacewatch || — || align=right | 1.1 km || 
|-id=384 bgcolor=#fefefe
| 184384 ||  || — || June 6, 2005 || Kitt Peak || Spacewatch || FLO || align=right | 1.1 km || 
|-id=385 bgcolor=#E9E9E9
| 184385 ||  || — || June 6, 2005 || Kitt Peak || Spacewatch || MIS || align=right | 3.5 km || 
|-id=386 bgcolor=#fefefe
| 184386 ||  || — || June 10, 2005 || Kitt Peak || Spacewatch || — || align=right | 1.1 km || 
|-id=387 bgcolor=#E9E9E9
| 184387 ||  || — || June 11, 2005 || Catalina || CSS || GER || align=right | 3.3 km || 
|-id=388 bgcolor=#d6d6d6
| 184388 ||  || — || June 12, 2005 || Kitt Peak || Spacewatch || KOR || align=right | 2.0 km || 
|-id=389 bgcolor=#fefefe
| 184389 ||  || — || June 13, 2005 || Mount Lemmon || Mount Lemmon Survey || NYS || align=right | 1.1 km || 
|-id=390 bgcolor=#E9E9E9
| 184390 ||  || — || June 14, 2005 || Mount Lemmon || Mount Lemmon Survey || VIB || align=right | 3.1 km || 
|-id=391 bgcolor=#fefefe
| 184391 ||  || — || June 4, 2005 || Catalina || CSS || — || align=right | 1.2 km || 
|-id=392 bgcolor=#fefefe
| 184392 ||  || — || June 16, 2005 || Mount Lemmon || Mount Lemmon Survey || NYS || align=right data-sort-value="0.92" | 920 m || 
|-id=393 bgcolor=#fefefe
| 184393 ||  || — || June 17, 2005 || Mount Lemmon || Mount Lemmon Survey || MAS || align=right | 1.1 km || 
|-id=394 bgcolor=#fefefe
| 184394 ||  || — || June 21, 2005 || Palomar || NEAT || — || align=right | 1.7 km || 
|-id=395 bgcolor=#fefefe
| 184395 ||  || — || June 21, 2005 || Palomar || NEAT || — || align=right | 1.7 km || 
|-id=396 bgcolor=#fefefe
| 184396 ||  || — || June 24, 2005 || Palomar || NEAT || — || align=right | 1.3 km || 
|-id=397 bgcolor=#fefefe
| 184397 ||  || — || June 28, 2005 || Kitt Peak || Spacewatch || — || align=right | 1.1 km || 
|-id=398 bgcolor=#fefefe
| 184398 ||  || — || June 27, 2005 || Kitt Peak || Spacewatch || — || align=right | 1.0 km || 
|-id=399 bgcolor=#fefefe
| 184399 ||  || — || June 28, 2005 || Palomar || NEAT || — || align=right | 1.3 km || 
|-id=400 bgcolor=#fefefe
| 184400 ||  || — || June 28, 2005 || Palomar || NEAT || — || align=right data-sort-value="0.87" | 870 m || 
|}

184401–184500 

|-bgcolor=#fefefe
| 184401 ||  || — || June 28, 2005 || Palomar || NEAT || — || align=right | 1.3 km || 
|-id=402 bgcolor=#fefefe
| 184402 ||  || — || June 29, 2005 || Palomar || NEAT || V || align=right | 1.0 km || 
|-id=403 bgcolor=#fefefe
| 184403 ||  || — || June 28, 2005 || Palomar || NEAT || — || align=right | 2.6 km || 
|-id=404 bgcolor=#E9E9E9
| 184404 ||  || — || June 29, 2005 || Palomar || NEAT || — || align=right | 1.5 km || 
|-id=405 bgcolor=#E9E9E9
| 184405 ||  || — || June 27, 2005 || Kitt Peak || Spacewatch || HEN || align=right | 1.3 km || 
|-id=406 bgcolor=#fefefe
| 184406 ||  || — || June 30, 2005 || Kitt Peak || Spacewatch || MAS || align=right data-sort-value="0.93" | 930 m || 
|-id=407 bgcolor=#E9E9E9
| 184407 ||  || — || June 30, 2005 || Kitt Peak || Spacewatch || — || align=right | 1.4 km || 
|-id=408 bgcolor=#fefefe
| 184408 ||  || — || June 30, 2005 || Catalina || CSS || — || align=right | 2.8 km || 
|-id=409 bgcolor=#fefefe
| 184409 ||  || — || June 27, 2005 || Kitt Peak || Spacewatch || MAS || align=right data-sort-value="0.96" | 960 m || 
|-id=410 bgcolor=#E9E9E9
| 184410 ||  || — || June 29, 2005 || Kitt Peak || Spacewatch || PAD || align=right | 2.5 km || 
|-id=411 bgcolor=#E9E9E9
| 184411 ||  || — || June 30, 2005 || Kitt Peak || Spacewatch || RAF || align=right | 1.6 km || 
|-id=412 bgcolor=#fefefe
| 184412 ||  || — || June 30, 2005 || Catalina || CSS || PHO || align=right | 1.6 km || 
|-id=413 bgcolor=#fefefe
| 184413 ||  || — || June 28, 2005 || Palomar || NEAT || NYS || align=right | 1.1 km || 
|-id=414 bgcolor=#E9E9E9
| 184414 ||  || — || June 30, 2005 || Kitt Peak || Spacewatch || — || align=right | 1.3 km || 
|-id=415 bgcolor=#fefefe
| 184415 ||  || — || June 29, 2005 || Palomar || NEAT || MAS || align=right | 1.1 km || 
|-id=416 bgcolor=#fefefe
| 184416 ||  || — || June 29, 2005 || Palomar || NEAT || NYS || align=right | 1.1 km || 
|-id=417 bgcolor=#d6d6d6
| 184417 ||  || — || June 30, 2005 || Kitt Peak || Spacewatch || KOR || align=right | 1.6 km || 
|-id=418 bgcolor=#fefefe
| 184418 ||  || — || June 28, 2005 || Palomar || NEAT || — || align=right | 1.3 km || 
|-id=419 bgcolor=#fefefe
| 184419 ||  || — || June 30, 2005 || Anderson Mesa || LONEOS || — || align=right | 1.4 km || 
|-id=420 bgcolor=#d6d6d6
| 184420 ||  || — || June 30, 2005 || Kitt Peak || Spacewatch || — || align=right | 4.0 km || 
|-id=421 bgcolor=#fefefe
| 184421 ||  || — || July 2, 2005 || Kitt Peak || Spacewatch || — || align=right | 1.3 km || 
|-id=422 bgcolor=#E9E9E9
| 184422 ||  || — || July 2, 2005 || Kitt Peak || Spacewatch || — || align=right | 1.1 km || 
|-id=423 bgcolor=#FA8072
| 184423 ||  || — || July 3, 2005 || Palomar || NEAT || — || align=right | 1.3 km || 
|-id=424 bgcolor=#E9E9E9
| 184424 ||  || — || July 1, 2005 || Kitt Peak || Spacewatch || — || align=right | 1.5 km || 
|-id=425 bgcolor=#d6d6d6
| 184425 ||  || — || July 1, 2005 || Kitt Peak || Spacewatch || — || align=right | 3.4 km || 
|-id=426 bgcolor=#E9E9E9
| 184426 ||  || — || July 1, 2005 || Kitt Peak || Spacewatch || AGN || align=right | 1.4 km || 
|-id=427 bgcolor=#E9E9E9
| 184427 ||  || — || July 4, 2005 || Mount Lemmon || Mount Lemmon Survey || — || align=right | 1.6 km || 
|-id=428 bgcolor=#fefefe
| 184428 ||  || — || July 5, 2005 || Kitt Peak || Spacewatch || NYS || align=right | 1.1 km || 
|-id=429 bgcolor=#E9E9E9
| 184429 ||  || — || July 5, 2005 || Kitt Peak || Spacewatch || — || align=right | 1.5 km || 
|-id=430 bgcolor=#fefefe
| 184430 ||  || — || July 4, 2005 || Kitt Peak || Spacewatch || — || align=right | 1.0 km || 
|-id=431 bgcolor=#E9E9E9
| 184431 ||  || — || July 4, 2005 || Kitt Peak || Spacewatch || — || align=right | 1.8 km || 
|-id=432 bgcolor=#fefefe
| 184432 ||  || — || July 5, 2005 || Mount Lemmon || Mount Lemmon Survey || NYS || align=right data-sort-value="0.86" | 860 m || 
|-id=433 bgcolor=#fefefe
| 184433 ||  || — || July 2, 2005 || Reedy Creek || J. Broughton || — || align=right | 1.2 km || 
|-id=434 bgcolor=#d6d6d6
| 184434 ||  || — || July 1, 2005 || Kitt Peak || Spacewatch || CHA || align=right | 2.8 km || 
|-id=435 bgcolor=#d6d6d6
| 184435 ||  || — || July 1, 2005 || Kitt Peak || Spacewatch || CHA || align=right | 2.5 km || 
|-id=436 bgcolor=#E9E9E9
| 184436 ||  || — || July 4, 2005 || Kitt Peak || Spacewatch || WIT || align=right | 1.2 km || 
|-id=437 bgcolor=#fefefe
| 184437 ||  || — || July 5, 2005 || Mount Lemmon || Mount Lemmon Survey || NYS || align=right data-sort-value="0.87" | 870 m || 
|-id=438 bgcolor=#fefefe
| 184438 ||  || — || July 5, 2005 || Palomar || NEAT || V || align=right data-sort-value="0.74" | 740 m || 
|-id=439 bgcolor=#E9E9E9
| 184439 ||  || — || July 5, 2005 || Kitt Peak || Spacewatch || — || align=right | 2.8 km || 
|-id=440 bgcolor=#E9E9E9
| 184440 ||  || — || July 5, 2005 || Kitt Peak || Spacewatch || KON || align=right | 5.2 km || 
|-id=441 bgcolor=#fefefe
| 184441 ||  || — || July 5, 2005 || Kitt Peak || Spacewatch || — || align=right | 1.3 km || 
|-id=442 bgcolor=#E9E9E9
| 184442 ||  || — || July 5, 2005 || Kitt Peak || Spacewatch || — || align=right | 1.2 km || 
|-id=443 bgcolor=#E9E9E9
| 184443 ||  || — || July 4, 2005 || Kitt Peak || Spacewatch || — || align=right | 1.4 km || 
|-id=444 bgcolor=#d6d6d6
| 184444 ||  || — || July 5, 2005 || Mount Lemmon || Mount Lemmon Survey || — || align=right | 2.5 km || 
|-id=445 bgcolor=#E9E9E9
| 184445 ||  || — || July 5, 2005 || Mount Lemmon || Mount Lemmon Survey || — || align=right | 1.0 km || 
|-id=446 bgcolor=#E9E9E9
| 184446 ||  || — || July 4, 2005 || Catalina || CSS || — || align=right | 1.6 km || 
|-id=447 bgcolor=#fefefe
| 184447 ||  || — || July 4, 2005 || Socorro || LINEAR || — || align=right | 1.8 km || 
|-id=448 bgcolor=#fefefe
| 184448 ||  || — || July 8, 2005 || Kitt Peak || Spacewatch || — || align=right | 1.0 km || 
|-id=449 bgcolor=#FA8072
| 184449 ||  || — || July 7, 2005 || Reedy Creek || J. Broughton || — || align=right | 1.1 km || 
|-id=450 bgcolor=#fefefe
| 184450 ||  || — || July 5, 2005 || Palomar || NEAT || NYS || align=right | 1.1 km || 
|-id=451 bgcolor=#fefefe
| 184451 ||  || — || July 9, 2005 || Kitt Peak || Spacewatch || NYS || align=right data-sort-value="0.92" | 920 m || 
|-id=452 bgcolor=#d6d6d6
| 184452 ||  || — || July 13, 2005 || RAS || A. Lowe || URS || align=right | 6.1 km || 
|-id=453 bgcolor=#fefefe
| 184453 ||  || — || July 1, 2005 || Kitt Peak || Spacewatch || — || align=right data-sort-value="0.91" | 910 m || 
|-id=454 bgcolor=#d6d6d6
| 184454 ||  || — || July 1, 2005 || Kitt Peak || Spacewatch || — || align=right | 3.3 km || 
|-id=455 bgcolor=#fefefe
| 184455 ||  || — || July 2, 2005 || Catalina || CSS || — || align=right | 1.9 km || 
|-id=456 bgcolor=#d6d6d6
| 184456 ||  || — || July 4, 2005 || Mount Lemmon || Mount Lemmon Survey || KOR || align=right | 1.5 km || 
|-id=457 bgcolor=#d6d6d6
| 184457 ||  || — || July 10, 2005 || Kitt Peak || Spacewatch || EOS || align=right | 3.0 km || 
|-id=458 bgcolor=#fefefe
| 184458 ||  || — || July 10, 2005 || Reedy Creek || J. Broughton || FLO || align=right | 1.1 km || 
|-id=459 bgcolor=#fefefe
| 184459 ||  || — || July 10, 2005 || Reedy Creek || J. Broughton || V || align=right | 1.1 km || 
|-id=460 bgcolor=#fefefe
| 184460 ||  || — || July 13, 2005 || Reedy Creek || J. Broughton || NYS || align=right data-sort-value="0.96" | 960 m || 
|-id=461 bgcolor=#fefefe
| 184461 ||  || — || July 14, 2005 || Reedy Creek || J. Broughton || NYS || align=right data-sort-value="0.88" | 880 m || 
|-id=462 bgcolor=#E9E9E9
| 184462 ||  || — || July 9, 2005 || Kitt Peak || Spacewatch || — || align=right | 3.2 km || 
|-id=463 bgcolor=#E9E9E9
| 184463 ||  || — || July 12, 2005 || Mount Lemmon || Mount Lemmon Survey || — || align=right | 1.3 km || 
|-id=464 bgcolor=#fefefe
| 184464 ||  || — || July 15, 2005 || Kitt Peak || Spacewatch || NYS || align=right data-sort-value="0.99" | 990 m || 
|-id=465 bgcolor=#fefefe
| 184465 ||  || — || July 2, 2005 || Catalina || CSS || — || align=right | 1.3 km || 
|-id=466 bgcolor=#E9E9E9
| 184466 ||  || — || July 3, 2005 || Mount Lemmon || Mount Lemmon Survey || — || align=right | 1.7 km || 
|-id=467 bgcolor=#E9E9E9
| 184467 ||  || — || July 3, 2005 || Mount Lemmon || Mount Lemmon Survey || — || align=right | 1.6 km || 
|-id=468 bgcolor=#d6d6d6
| 184468 ||  || — || July 10, 2005 || Catalina || CSS || — || align=right | 4.8 km || 
|-id=469 bgcolor=#fefefe
| 184469 ||  || — || July 10, 2005 || Catalina || CSS || — || align=right | 1.2 km || 
|-id=470 bgcolor=#fefefe
| 184470 ||  || — || July 11, 2005 || Kitt Peak || Spacewatch || — || align=right | 1.9 km || 
|-id=471 bgcolor=#fefefe
| 184471 ||  || — || July 2, 2005 || Catalina || CSS || MAS || align=right | 1.5 km || 
|-id=472 bgcolor=#E9E9E9
| 184472 ||  || — || July 12, 2005 || Mount Lemmon || Mount Lemmon Survey || — || align=right | 1.9 km || 
|-id=473 bgcolor=#E9E9E9
| 184473 ||  || — || July 3, 2005 || Mount Lemmon || Mount Lemmon Survey || HEN || align=right | 2.9 km || 
|-id=474 bgcolor=#fefefe
| 184474 || 2005 OA || — || July 16, 2005 || RAS || A. Lowe || — || align=right | 1.0 km || 
|-id=475 bgcolor=#fefefe
| 184475 || 2005 OV || — || July 17, 2005 || Haleakala || NEAT || V || align=right data-sort-value="0.97" | 970 m || 
|-id=476 bgcolor=#E9E9E9
| 184476 ||  || — || July 26, 2005 || Reedy Creek || J. Broughton || — || align=right | 1.6 km || 
|-id=477 bgcolor=#fefefe
| 184477 ||  || — || July 26, 2005 || Reedy Creek || J. Broughton || — || align=right | 1.4 km || 
|-id=478 bgcolor=#fefefe
| 184478 ||  || — || July 28, 2005 || Palomar || NEAT || — || align=right | 2.3 km || 
|-id=479 bgcolor=#fefefe
| 184479 ||  || — || July 28, 2005 || Palomar || NEAT || — || align=right | 1.1 km || 
|-id=480 bgcolor=#d6d6d6
| 184480 ||  || — || July 26, 2005 || Palomar || NEAT || — || align=right | 3.4 km || 
|-id=481 bgcolor=#fefefe
| 184481 ||  || — || July 28, 2005 || Palomar || NEAT || MAS || align=right | 1.4 km || 
|-id=482 bgcolor=#fefefe
| 184482 ||  || — || July 29, 2005 || Palomar || NEAT || MAS || align=right data-sort-value="0.99" | 990 m || 
|-id=483 bgcolor=#fefefe
| 184483 ||  || — || July 27, 2005 || Reedy Creek || J. Broughton || V || align=right | 1.2 km || 
|-id=484 bgcolor=#E9E9E9
| 184484 ||  || — || July 29, 2005 || Palomar || NEAT || — || align=right | 1.5 km || 
|-id=485 bgcolor=#d6d6d6
| 184485 ||  || — || July 30, 2005 || Palomar || NEAT || LIX || align=right | 4.8 km || 
|-id=486 bgcolor=#E9E9E9
| 184486 ||  || — || July 30, 2005 || Palomar || NEAT || — || align=right | 3.8 km || 
|-id=487 bgcolor=#d6d6d6
| 184487 ||  || — || July 30, 2005 || Palomar || NEAT || 628 || align=right | 2.6 km || 
|-id=488 bgcolor=#E9E9E9
| 184488 ||  || — || July 30, 2005 || Palomar || NEAT || RAF || align=right | 1.1 km || 
|-id=489 bgcolor=#E9E9E9
| 184489 ||  || — || July 31, 2005 || Palomar || NEAT || — || align=right | 2.0 km || 
|-id=490 bgcolor=#d6d6d6
| 184490 ||  || — || July 28, 2005 || Palomar || NEAT || — || align=right | 3.9 km || 
|-id=491 bgcolor=#fefefe
| 184491 ||  || — || July 28, 2005 || Palomar || NEAT || — || align=right | 1.4 km || 
|-id=492 bgcolor=#E9E9E9
| 184492 ||  || — || July 28, 2005 || Palomar || NEAT || WIT || align=right | 1.6 km || 
|-id=493 bgcolor=#E9E9E9
| 184493 ||  || — || July 29, 2005 || Palomar || NEAT || — || align=right | 2.8 km || 
|-id=494 bgcolor=#E9E9E9
| 184494 ||  || — || July 17, 2005 || Palomar || NEAT || — || align=right | 3.1 km || 
|-id=495 bgcolor=#fefefe
| 184495 ||  || — || July 29, 2005 || Palomar || NEAT || NYS || align=right | 1.1 km || 
|-id=496 bgcolor=#d6d6d6
| 184496 ||  || — || July 30, 2005 || Palomar || NEAT || — || align=right | 4.3 km || 
|-id=497 bgcolor=#fefefe
| 184497 ||  || — || August 1, 2005 || Siding Spring || SSS || NYS || align=right | 1.1 km || 
|-id=498 bgcolor=#fefefe
| 184498 ||  || — || August 2, 2005 || Socorro || LINEAR || MAS || align=right | 1.3 km || 
|-id=499 bgcolor=#fefefe
| 184499 ||  || — || August 2, 2005 || Socorro || LINEAR || NYS || align=right | 1.5 km || 
|-id=500 bgcolor=#fefefe
| 184500 ||  || — || August 8, 2005 || Village-Neuf || Village-Neuf Obs. || — || align=right | 1.3 km || 
|}

184501–184600 

|-bgcolor=#fefefe
| 184501 Pimprenelle ||  ||  || August 9, 2005 || Saint-Sulpice || B. Christophe || MAS || align=right | 1.1 km || 
|-id=502 bgcolor=#fefefe
| 184502 ||  || — || August 9, 2005 || Reedy Creek || J. Broughton || — || align=right | 1.3 km || 
|-id=503 bgcolor=#fefefe
| 184503 ||  || — || August 4, 2005 || Palomar || NEAT || — || align=right | 1.1 km || 
|-id=504 bgcolor=#d6d6d6
| 184504 ||  || — || August 4, 2005 || Palomar || NEAT || — || align=right | 4.4 km || 
|-id=505 bgcolor=#fefefe
| 184505 ||  || — || August 4, 2005 || Palomar || NEAT || MAS || align=right data-sort-value="0.96" | 960 m || 
|-id=506 bgcolor=#E9E9E9
| 184506 ||  || — || August 4, 2005 || Palomar || NEAT || PAE || align=right | 4.5 km || 
|-id=507 bgcolor=#d6d6d6
| 184507 ||  || — || August 4, 2005 || Palomar || NEAT || EOS || align=right | 2.6 km || 
|-id=508 bgcolor=#E9E9E9
| 184508 Courroux ||  ||  || August 10, 2005 || Vicques || M. Ory || — || align=right | 4.4 km || 
|-id=509 bgcolor=#d6d6d6
| 184509 ||  || — || August 2, 2005 || Socorro || LINEAR || EUP || align=right | 5.0 km || 
|-id=510 bgcolor=#fefefe
| 184510 || 2005 QS || — || August 22, 2005 || Palomar || NEAT || FLO || align=right | 1.0 km || 
|-id=511 bgcolor=#fefefe
| 184511 || 2005 QT || — || August 22, 2005 || Palomar || NEAT || NYS || align=right | 1.2 km || 
|-id=512 bgcolor=#E9E9E9
| 184512 ||  || — || August 24, 2005 || Palomar || NEAT || AGN || align=right | 1.8 km || 
|-id=513 bgcolor=#E9E9E9
| 184513 ||  || — || August 24, 2005 || Palomar || NEAT || — || align=right | 2.7 km || 
|-id=514 bgcolor=#d6d6d6
| 184514 ||  || — || August 24, 2005 || Palomar || NEAT || — || align=right | 3.9 km || 
|-id=515 bgcolor=#E9E9E9
| 184515 ||  || — || August 24, 2005 || Palomar || NEAT || AGN || align=right | 1.6 km || 
|-id=516 bgcolor=#E9E9E9
| 184516 ||  || — || August 24, 2005 || Palomar || NEAT || HOF || align=right | 3.3 km || 
|-id=517 bgcolor=#E9E9E9
| 184517 ||  || — || August 25, 2005 || Palomar || NEAT || — || align=right | 2.6 km || 
|-id=518 bgcolor=#fefefe
| 184518 ||  || — || August 24, 2005 || Palomar || NEAT || V || align=right | 1.1 km || 
|-id=519 bgcolor=#E9E9E9
| 184519 ||  || — || August 24, 2005 || Needville || Needville Obs. || — || align=right | 5.3 km || 
|-id=520 bgcolor=#E9E9E9
| 184520 ||  || — || August 25, 2005 || Palomar || NEAT || — || align=right | 3.3 km || 
|-id=521 bgcolor=#d6d6d6
| 184521 ||  || — || August 25, 2005 || Palomar || NEAT || — || align=right | 4.8 km || 
|-id=522 bgcolor=#fefefe
| 184522 ||  || — || August 25, 2005 || Palomar || NEAT || ERI || align=right | 2.9 km || 
|-id=523 bgcolor=#d6d6d6
| 184523 ||  || — || August 25, 2005 || Palomar || NEAT || TEL || align=right | 3.2 km || 
|-id=524 bgcolor=#d6d6d6
| 184524 ||  || — || August 25, 2005 || Palomar || NEAT || — || align=right | 5.2 km || 
|-id=525 bgcolor=#fefefe
| 184525 ||  || — || August 25, 2005 || Palomar || NEAT || MAS || align=right | 1.2 km || 
|-id=526 bgcolor=#E9E9E9
| 184526 ||  || — || August 25, 2005 || Campo Imperatore || CINEOS || — || align=right | 3.1 km || 
|-id=527 bgcolor=#E9E9E9
| 184527 ||  || — || August 26, 2005 || Anderson Mesa || LONEOS || — || align=right | 3.5 km || 
|-id=528 bgcolor=#E9E9E9
| 184528 ||  || — || August 27, 2005 || Anderson Mesa || LONEOS || — || align=right | 1.8 km || 
|-id=529 bgcolor=#d6d6d6
| 184529 ||  || — || August 27, 2005 || Kitt Peak || Spacewatch || — || align=right | 3.8 km || 
|-id=530 bgcolor=#E9E9E9
| 184530 ||  || — || August 27, 2005 || Kitt Peak || Spacewatch || — || align=right | 2.3 km || 
|-id=531 bgcolor=#d6d6d6
| 184531 ||  || — || August 27, 2005 || Kitt Peak || Spacewatch || THM || align=right | 3.7 km || 
|-id=532 bgcolor=#d6d6d6
| 184532 ||  || — || August 27, 2005 || Kitt Peak || Spacewatch || CHA || align=right | 2.7 km || 
|-id=533 bgcolor=#d6d6d6
| 184533 ||  || — || August 27, 2005 || Kitt Peak || Spacewatch || KOR || align=right | 2.2 km || 
|-id=534 bgcolor=#d6d6d6
| 184534 ||  || — || August 27, 2005 || Anderson Mesa || LONEOS || — || align=right | 4.9 km || 
|-id=535 bgcolor=#d6d6d6
| 184535 Audouze ||  ||  || August 29, 2005 || Saint-Sulpice || B. Christophe || — || align=right | 4.9 km || 
|-id=536 bgcolor=#d6d6d6
| 184536 ||  || — || August 24, 2005 || Palomar || NEAT || — || align=right | 4.5 km || 
|-id=537 bgcolor=#d6d6d6
| 184537 ||  || — || August 25, 2005 || Palomar || NEAT || — || align=right | 3.3 km || 
|-id=538 bgcolor=#E9E9E9
| 184538 ||  || — || August 25, 2005 || Palomar || NEAT || GEF || align=right | 2.4 km || 
|-id=539 bgcolor=#d6d6d6
| 184539 ||  || — || August 25, 2005 || Palomar || NEAT || — || align=right | 5.2 km || 
|-id=540 bgcolor=#d6d6d6
| 184540 ||  || — || August 25, 2005 || Palomar || NEAT || — || align=right | 3.1 km || 
|-id=541 bgcolor=#E9E9E9
| 184541 ||  || — || August 25, 2005 || Palomar || NEAT || VIB || align=right | 2.9 km || 
|-id=542 bgcolor=#E9E9E9
| 184542 ||  || — || August 26, 2005 || Anderson Mesa || LONEOS || — || align=right | 3.1 km || 
|-id=543 bgcolor=#fefefe
| 184543 ||  || — || August 26, 2005 || Palomar || NEAT || ERI || align=right | 1.8 km || 
|-id=544 bgcolor=#E9E9E9
| 184544 ||  || — || August 26, 2005 || Anderson Mesa || LONEOS || VIB || align=right | 3.6 km || 
|-id=545 bgcolor=#E9E9E9
| 184545 ||  || — || August 26, 2005 || Palomar || NEAT || — || align=right | 1.7 km || 
|-id=546 bgcolor=#E9E9E9
| 184546 ||  || — || August 26, 2005 || Palomar || NEAT || — || align=right | 3.9 km || 
|-id=547 bgcolor=#E9E9E9
| 184547 ||  || — || August 26, 2005 || Palomar || NEAT || — || align=right | 3.3 km || 
|-id=548 bgcolor=#E9E9E9
| 184548 ||  || — || August 26, 2005 || Palomar || NEAT || — || align=right | 2.0 km || 
|-id=549 bgcolor=#d6d6d6
| 184549 ||  || — || August 26, 2005 || Palomar || NEAT || — || align=right | 5.2 km || 
|-id=550 bgcolor=#E9E9E9
| 184550 ||  || — || August 26, 2005 || Palomar || NEAT || — || align=right | 3.0 km || 
|-id=551 bgcolor=#fefefe
| 184551 ||  || — || August 26, 2005 || Palomar || NEAT || MAS || align=right | 1.2 km || 
|-id=552 bgcolor=#fefefe
| 184552 ||  || — || August 26, 2005 || Palomar || NEAT || NYS || align=right | 1.3 km || 
|-id=553 bgcolor=#E9E9E9
| 184553 ||  || — || August 26, 2005 || Palomar || NEAT || — || align=right | 1.7 km || 
|-id=554 bgcolor=#d6d6d6
| 184554 ||  || — || August 26, 2005 || Palomar || NEAT || — || align=right | 3.4 km || 
|-id=555 bgcolor=#fefefe
| 184555 ||  || — || August 26, 2005 || Palomar || NEAT || — || align=right | 1.2 km || 
|-id=556 bgcolor=#E9E9E9
| 184556 ||  || — || August 27, 2005 || Anderson Mesa || LONEOS || PAD || align=right | 3.2 km || 
|-id=557 bgcolor=#E9E9E9
| 184557 ||  || — || August 27, 2005 || Haleakala || NEAT || DOR || align=right | 4.7 km || 
|-id=558 bgcolor=#E9E9E9
| 184558 ||  || — || August 28, 2005 || Kitt Peak || Spacewatch || — || align=right | 2.9 km || 
|-id=559 bgcolor=#fefefe
| 184559 ||  || — || August 29, 2005 || Jarnac || Jarnac Obs. || V || align=right data-sort-value="0.83" | 830 m || 
|-id=560 bgcolor=#d6d6d6
| 184560 ||  || — || August 25, 2005 || Palomar || NEAT || — || align=right | 4.3 km || 
|-id=561 bgcolor=#d6d6d6
| 184561 ||  || — || August 26, 2005 || Palomar || NEAT || THM || align=right | 2.9 km || 
|-id=562 bgcolor=#fefefe
| 184562 ||  || — || August 27, 2005 || Anderson Mesa || LONEOS || — || align=right | 1.3 km || 
|-id=563 bgcolor=#d6d6d6
| 184563 ||  || — || August 28, 2005 || Kitt Peak || Spacewatch || EOS || align=right | 2.0 km || 
|-id=564 bgcolor=#E9E9E9
| 184564 ||  || — || August 29, 2005 || Kitt Peak || Spacewatch || — || align=right | 3.6 km || 
|-id=565 bgcolor=#E9E9E9
| 184565 ||  || — || August 29, 2005 || Anderson Mesa || LONEOS || — || align=right | 2.7 km || 
|-id=566 bgcolor=#E9E9E9
| 184566 ||  || — || August 25, 2005 || Palomar || NEAT || — || align=right | 3.3 km || 
|-id=567 bgcolor=#E9E9E9
| 184567 ||  || — || August 26, 2005 || Campo Imperatore || CINEOS || HEN || align=right | 1.6 km || 
|-id=568 bgcolor=#fefefe
| 184568 ||  || — || August 28, 2005 || Anderson Mesa || LONEOS || MAS || align=right | 1.2 km || 
|-id=569 bgcolor=#d6d6d6
| 184569 ||  || — || August 29, 2005 || Anderson Mesa || LONEOS || — || align=right | 3.9 km || 
|-id=570 bgcolor=#E9E9E9
| 184570 ||  || — || August 30, 2005 || Socorro || LINEAR || MRX || align=right | 1.9 km || 
|-id=571 bgcolor=#E9E9E9
| 184571 ||  || — || August 25, 2005 || Palomar || NEAT || — || align=right | 2.7 km || 
|-id=572 bgcolor=#d6d6d6
| 184572 ||  || — || August 25, 2005 || Campo Imperatore || CINEOS || — || align=right | 3.5 km || 
|-id=573 bgcolor=#E9E9E9
| 184573 ||  || — || August 26, 2005 || Palomar || NEAT || NEM || align=right | 3.2 km || 
|-id=574 bgcolor=#E9E9E9
| 184574 ||  || — || August 26, 2005 || Palomar || NEAT || — || align=right | 2.5 km || 
|-id=575 bgcolor=#d6d6d6
| 184575 ||  || — || August 26, 2005 || Palomar || NEAT || — || align=right | 3.2 km || 
|-id=576 bgcolor=#E9E9E9
| 184576 ||  || — || August 26, 2005 || Haleakala || NEAT || — || align=right | 1.4 km || 
|-id=577 bgcolor=#fefefe
| 184577 ||  || — || August 27, 2005 || Palomar || NEAT || NYS || align=right | 1.1 km || 
|-id=578 bgcolor=#E9E9E9
| 184578 ||  || — || August 27, 2005 || Palomar || NEAT || — || align=right | 3.8 km || 
|-id=579 bgcolor=#E9E9E9
| 184579 ||  || — || August 27, 2005 || Palomar || NEAT || — || align=right | 1.3 km || 
|-id=580 bgcolor=#d6d6d6
| 184580 ||  || — || August 27, 2005 || Palomar || NEAT || — || align=right | 4.9 km || 
|-id=581 bgcolor=#E9E9E9
| 184581 ||  || — || August 27, 2005 || Palomar || NEAT || GEF || align=right | 2.0 km || 
|-id=582 bgcolor=#fefefe
| 184582 ||  || — || August 27, 2005 || Palomar || NEAT || ERI || align=right | 2.9 km || 
|-id=583 bgcolor=#E9E9E9
| 184583 ||  || — || August 27, 2005 || Palomar || NEAT || AGN || align=right | 1.8 km || 
|-id=584 bgcolor=#d6d6d6
| 184584 ||  || — || August 28, 2005 || Kitt Peak || Spacewatch || — || align=right | 3.2 km || 
|-id=585 bgcolor=#d6d6d6
| 184585 ||  || — || August 28, 2005 || Kitt Peak || Spacewatch || NAE || align=right | 3.0 km || 
|-id=586 bgcolor=#E9E9E9
| 184586 ||  || — || August 28, 2005 || Kitt Peak || Spacewatch || AGN || align=right | 1.7 km || 
|-id=587 bgcolor=#E9E9E9
| 184587 ||  || — || August 28, 2005 || Kitt Peak || Spacewatch || AST || align=right | 3.0 km || 
|-id=588 bgcolor=#E9E9E9
| 184588 ||  || — || August 28, 2005 || Kitt Peak || Spacewatch || — || align=right | 1.6 km || 
|-id=589 bgcolor=#E9E9E9
| 184589 ||  || — || August 28, 2005 || Kitt Peak || Spacewatch || HEN || align=right | 1.3 km || 
|-id=590 bgcolor=#d6d6d6
| 184590 ||  || — || August 28, 2005 || Kitt Peak || Spacewatch || — || align=right | 4.0 km || 
|-id=591 bgcolor=#d6d6d6
| 184591 ||  || — || August 28, 2005 || Kitt Peak || Spacewatch || — || align=right | 2.6 km || 
|-id=592 bgcolor=#d6d6d6
| 184592 ||  || — || August 28, 2005 || Kitt Peak || Spacewatch || — || align=right | 3.5 km || 
|-id=593 bgcolor=#E9E9E9
| 184593 ||  || — || August 28, 2005 || Kitt Peak || Spacewatch || — || align=right | 1.4 km || 
|-id=594 bgcolor=#fefefe
| 184594 ||  || — || August 31, 2005 || Anderson Mesa || LONEOS || V || align=right | 1.3 km || 
|-id=595 bgcolor=#E9E9E9
| 184595 ||  || — || August 26, 2005 || Palomar || NEAT || — || align=right | 1.5 km || 
|-id=596 bgcolor=#E9E9E9
| 184596 ||  || — || August 30, 2005 || Anderson Mesa || LONEOS || — || align=right | 4.5 km || 
|-id=597 bgcolor=#fefefe
| 184597 ||  || — || August 30, 2005 || Anderson Mesa || LONEOS || FLO || align=right | 1.0 km || 
|-id=598 bgcolor=#E9E9E9
| 184598 ||  || — || August 30, 2005 || Anderson Mesa || LONEOS || — || align=right | 2.6 km || 
|-id=599 bgcolor=#E9E9E9
| 184599 ||  || — || August 27, 2005 || Kitt Peak || Spacewatch || HEN || align=right | 1.6 km || 
|-id=600 bgcolor=#fefefe
| 184600 ||  || — || August 27, 2005 || Palomar || NEAT || — || align=right | 1.5 km || 
|}

184601–184700 

|-bgcolor=#E9E9E9
| 184601 ||  || — || August 28, 2005 || Kitt Peak || Spacewatch || — || align=right data-sort-value="0.96" | 960 m || 
|-id=602 bgcolor=#E9E9E9
| 184602 ||  || — || August 28, 2005 || Siding Spring || SSS || — || align=right | 2.8 km || 
|-id=603 bgcolor=#E9E9E9
| 184603 ||  || — || August 29, 2005 || Socorro || LINEAR || — || align=right | 4.3 km || 
|-id=604 bgcolor=#d6d6d6
| 184604 ||  || — || August 31, 2005 || Anderson Mesa || LONEOS || EOS || align=right | 2.9 km || 
|-id=605 bgcolor=#d6d6d6
| 184605 ||  || — || August 27, 2005 || Palomar || NEAT || — || align=right | 3.9 km || 
|-id=606 bgcolor=#fefefe
| 184606 ||  || — || August 26, 2005 || Palomar || NEAT || — || align=right | 1.0 km || 
|-id=607 bgcolor=#d6d6d6
| 184607 ||  || — || August 31, 2005 || Palomar || NEAT || — || align=right | 3.1 km || 
|-id=608 bgcolor=#E9E9E9
| 184608 ||  || — || August 31, 2005 || Palomar || NEAT || HOF || align=right | 3.6 km || 
|-id=609 bgcolor=#E9E9E9
| 184609 ||  || — || August 31, 2005 || Kitt Peak || Spacewatch || — || align=right | 3.2 km || 
|-id=610 bgcolor=#E9E9E9
| 184610 || 2005 RN || — || September 1, 2005 || Saint-Véran || Saint-Véran Obs. || — || align=right | 2.6 km || 
|-id=611 bgcolor=#fefefe
| 184611 ||  || — || September 5, 2005 || Catalina || CSS || MAS || align=right | 1.4 km || 
|-id=612 bgcolor=#fefefe
| 184612 ||  || — || September 3, 2005 || Palomar || NEAT || ERI || align=right | 2.7 km || 
|-id=613 bgcolor=#E9E9E9
| 184613 ||  || — || September 8, 2005 || Socorro || LINEAR || — || align=right | 3.3 km || 
|-id=614 bgcolor=#E9E9E9
| 184614 ||  || — || September 8, 2005 || Socorro || LINEAR || — || align=right | 4.3 km || 
|-id=615 bgcolor=#fefefe
| 184615 ||  || — || September 6, 2005 || Siding Spring || SSS || — || align=right | 1.4 km || 
|-id=616 bgcolor=#d6d6d6
| 184616 ||  || — || September 10, 2005 || Anderson Mesa || LONEOS || EOSslow || align=right | 4.1 km || 
|-id=617 bgcolor=#E9E9E9
| 184617 ||  || — || September 1, 2005 || Kitt Peak || Spacewatch || AGN || align=right | 1.6 km || 
|-id=618 bgcolor=#d6d6d6
| 184618 ||  || — || September 1, 2005 || Kitt Peak || Spacewatch || — || align=right | 4.0 km || 
|-id=619 bgcolor=#E9E9E9
| 184619 ||  || — || September 6, 2005 || Anderson Mesa || LONEOS || — || align=right | 3.0 km || 
|-id=620 bgcolor=#d6d6d6
| 184620 Pippobattaglia ||  ||  || September 10, 2005 || Vallemare di Borbona || V. S. Casulli || — || align=right | 4.5 km || 
|-id=621 bgcolor=#d6d6d6
| 184621 ||  || — || September 12, 2005 || Junk Bond || D. Healy || KAR || align=right | 1.6 km || 
|-id=622 bgcolor=#E9E9E9
| 184622 ||  || — || September 8, 2005 || Socorro || LINEAR || AEO || align=right | 1.7 km || 
|-id=623 bgcolor=#d6d6d6
| 184623 ||  || — || September 8, 2005 || Socorro || LINEAR || — || align=right | 4.8 km || 
|-id=624 bgcolor=#d6d6d6
| 184624 ||  || — || September 7, 2005 || Bergisch Gladbach || W. Bickel || — || align=right | 3.9 km || 
|-id=625 bgcolor=#E9E9E9
| 184625 ||  || — || September 8, 2005 || Socorro || LINEAR || — || align=right | 2.3 km || 
|-id=626 bgcolor=#E9E9E9
| 184626 ||  || — || September 6, 2005 || Anderson Mesa || LONEOS || — || align=right | 3.0 km || 
|-id=627 bgcolor=#E9E9E9
| 184627 ||  || — || September 3, 2005 || Palomar || NEAT || — || align=right | 2.9 km || 
|-id=628 bgcolor=#d6d6d6
| 184628 ||  || — || September 14, 2005 || Apache Point || A. C. Becker || — || align=right | 3.9 km || 
|-id=629 bgcolor=#E9E9E9
| 184629 ||  || — || September 23, 2005 || Junk Bond || D. Healy || — || align=right | 1.4 km || 
|-id=630 bgcolor=#d6d6d6
| 184630 ||  || — || September 23, 2005 || Catalina || CSS || — || align=right | 3.4 km || 
|-id=631 bgcolor=#E9E9E9
| 184631 ||  || — || September 24, 2005 || Altschwendt || W. Ries || TIN || align=right | 1.4 km || 
|-id=632 bgcolor=#fefefe
| 184632 ||  || — || September 25, 2005 || Altschwendt || W. Ries || — || align=right | 1.4 km || 
|-id=633 bgcolor=#d6d6d6
| 184633 ||  || — || September 23, 2005 || Kitt Peak || Spacewatch || THM || align=right | 3.7 km || 
|-id=634 bgcolor=#d6d6d6
| 184634 ||  || — || September 23, 2005 || Kitt Peak || Spacewatch || — || align=right | 7.9 km || 
|-id=635 bgcolor=#fefefe
| 184635 ||  || — || September 23, 2005 || Catalina || CSS || FLO || align=right | 1.0 km || 
|-id=636 bgcolor=#d6d6d6
| 184636 ||  || — || September 24, 2005 || Kitt Peak || Spacewatch || — || align=right | 4.2 km || 
|-id=637 bgcolor=#d6d6d6
| 184637 ||  || — || September 25, 2005 || Catalina || CSS || 615 || align=right | 2.3 km || 
|-id=638 bgcolor=#d6d6d6
| 184638 ||  || — || September 26, 2005 || Kitt Peak || Spacewatch || — || align=right | 5.2 km || 
|-id=639 bgcolor=#d6d6d6
| 184639 ||  || — || September 26, 2005 || Kitt Peak || Spacewatch || HYG || align=right | 4.3 km || 
|-id=640 bgcolor=#E9E9E9
| 184640 ||  || — || September 23, 2005 || Kitt Peak || Spacewatch || — || align=right | 3.5 km || 
|-id=641 bgcolor=#E9E9E9
| 184641 ||  || — || September 23, 2005 || Kitt Peak || Spacewatch || AGN || align=right | 1.9 km || 
|-id=642 bgcolor=#d6d6d6
| 184642 ||  || — || September 25, 2005 || Kitt Peak || Spacewatch || — || align=right | 4.8 km || 
|-id=643 bgcolor=#E9E9E9
| 184643 ||  || — || September 26, 2005 || Catalina || CSS || GEF || align=right | 1.8 km || 
|-id=644 bgcolor=#E9E9E9
| 184644 ||  || — || September 23, 2005 || Kitt Peak || Spacewatch || — || align=right | 3.3 km || 
|-id=645 bgcolor=#d6d6d6
| 184645 ||  || — || September 23, 2005 || Kitt Peak || Spacewatch || KOR || align=right | 2.3 km || 
|-id=646 bgcolor=#E9E9E9
| 184646 ||  || — || September 24, 2005 || Anderson Mesa || LONEOS || — || align=right | 3.1 km || 
|-id=647 bgcolor=#d6d6d6
| 184647 ||  || — || September 24, 2005 || Anderson Mesa || LONEOS || — || align=right | 4.9 km || 
|-id=648 bgcolor=#fefefe
| 184648 ||  || — || September 23, 2005 || Kitt Peak || Spacewatch || NYS || align=right data-sort-value="0.99" | 990 m || 
|-id=649 bgcolor=#E9E9E9
| 184649 ||  || — || September 23, 2005 || Kitt Peak || Spacewatch || AGN || align=right | 2.0 km || 
|-id=650 bgcolor=#fefefe
| 184650 ||  || — || September 23, 2005 || Catalina || CSS || MAS || align=right data-sort-value="0.93" | 930 m || 
|-id=651 bgcolor=#d6d6d6
| 184651 ||  || — || September 23, 2005 || Kitt Peak || Spacewatch || KOR || align=right | 1.7 km || 
|-id=652 bgcolor=#d6d6d6
| 184652 ||  || — || September 23, 2005 || Kitt Peak || Spacewatch || — || align=right | 6.1 km || 
|-id=653 bgcolor=#d6d6d6
| 184653 ||  || — || September 23, 2005 || Kitt Peak || Spacewatch || — || align=right | 5.2 km || 
|-id=654 bgcolor=#d6d6d6
| 184654 ||  || — || September 23, 2005 || Kitt Peak || Spacewatch || KOR || align=right | 1.7 km || 
|-id=655 bgcolor=#d6d6d6
| 184655 ||  || — || September 23, 2005 || Kitt Peak || Spacewatch || — || align=right | 3.5 km || 
|-id=656 bgcolor=#E9E9E9
| 184656 ||  || — || September 23, 2005 || Kitt Peak || Spacewatch || AGN || align=right | 1.8 km || 
|-id=657 bgcolor=#E9E9E9
| 184657 ||  || — || September 24, 2005 || Kitt Peak || Spacewatch || HEN || align=right | 1.8 km || 
|-id=658 bgcolor=#d6d6d6
| 184658 ||  || — || September 24, 2005 || Kitt Peak || Spacewatch || THM || align=right | 3.7 km || 
|-id=659 bgcolor=#d6d6d6
| 184659 ||  || — || September 24, 2005 || Kitt Peak || Spacewatch || HYG || align=right | 3.4 km || 
|-id=660 bgcolor=#E9E9E9
| 184660 ||  || — || September 24, 2005 || Kitt Peak || Spacewatch || HEN || align=right | 1.7 km || 
|-id=661 bgcolor=#d6d6d6
| 184661 ||  || — || September 24, 2005 || Kitt Peak || Spacewatch || EOS || align=right | 3.7 km || 
|-id=662 bgcolor=#d6d6d6
| 184662 ||  || — || September 24, 2005 || Kitt Peak || Spacewatch || — || align=right | 3.7 km || 
|-id=663 bgcolor=#E9E9E9
| 184663 ||  || — || September 25, 2005 || Kitt Peak || Spacewatch || — || align=right | 3.8 km || 
|-id=664 bgcolor=#d6d6d6
| 184664 ||  || — || September 25, 2005 || Kitt Peak || Spacewatch || HYG || align=right | 5.1 km || 
|-id=665 bgcolor=#d6d6d6
| 184665 ||  || — || September 25, 2005 || Kitt Peak || Spacewatch || KOR || align=right | 1.6 km || 
|-id=666 bgcolor=#d6d6d6
| 184666 ||  || — || September 26, 2005 || Kitt Peak || Spacewatch || — || align=right | 4.1 km || 
|-id=667 bgcolor=#d6d6d6
| 184667 ||  || — || September 26, 2005 || Kitt Peak || Spacewatch || — || align=right | 3.2 km || 
|-id=668 bgcolor=#d6d6d6
| 184668 ||  || — || September 26, 2005 || Palomar || NEAT || — || align=right | 3.6 km || 
|-id=669 bgcolor=#E9E9E9
| 184669 ||  || — || September 26, 2005 || Kitt Peak || Spacewatch || — || align=right | 1.9 km || 
|-id=670 bgcolor=#E9E9E9
| 184670 ||  || — || September 26, 2005 || Kitt Peak || Spacewatch || RAF || align=right | 1.5 km || 
|-id=671 bgcolor=#E9E9E9
| 184671 ||  || — || September 26, 2005 || Kitt Peak || Spacewatch || MRX || align=right | 1.7 km || 
|-id=672 bgcolor=#d6d6d6
| 184672 ||  || — || September 26, 2005 || Kitt Peak || Spacewatch || — || align=right | 2.8 km || 
|-id=673 bgcolor=#d6d6d6
| 184673 ||  || — || September 26, 2005 || Palomar || NEAT || EOS || align=right | 3.2 km || 
|-id=674 bgcolor=#E9E9E9
| 184674 ||  || — || September 26, 2005 || Palomar || NEAT || NEM || align=right | 3.5 km || 
|-id=675 bgcolor=#d6d6d6
| 184675 ||  || — || September 23, 2005 || Catalina || CSS || — || align=right | 2.9 km || 
|-id=676 bgcolor=#d6d6d6
| 184676 ||  || — || September 24, 2005 || Kitt Peak || Spacewatch || — || align=right | 3.9 km || 
|-id=677 bgcolor=#d6d6d6
| 184677 ||  || — || September 24, 2005 || Kitt Peak || Spacewatch || THM || align=right | 2.9 km || 
|-id=678 bgcolor=#d6d6d6
| 184678 ||  || — || September 24, 2005 || Kitt Peak || Spacewatch || KOR || align=right | 1.8 km || 
|-id=679 bgcolor=#d6d6d6
| 184679 ||  || — || September 24, 2005 || Kitt Peak || Spacewatch || KOR || align=right | 1.9 km || 
|-id=680 bgcolor=#d6d6d6
| 184680 ||  || — || September 24, 2005 || Kitt Peak || Spacewatch || — || align=right | 3.1 km || 
|-id=681 bgcolor=#d6d6d6
| 184681 ||  || — || September 24, 2005 || Kitt Peak || Spacewatch || TEL || align=right | 1.8 km || 
|-id=682 bgcolor=#d6d6d6
| 184682 ||  || — || September 24, 2005 || Kitt Peak || Spacewatch || SYL7:4 || align=right | 7.2 km || 
|-id=683 bgcolor=#d6d6d6
| 184683 ||  || — || September 24, 2005 || Kitt Peak || Spacewatch || EOS || align=right | 2.2 km || 
|-id=684 bgcolor=#E9E9E9
| 184684 ||  || — || September 24, 2005 || Kitt Peak || Spacewatch || AGN || align=right | 1.8 km || 
|-id=685 bgcolor=#d6d6d6
| 184685 ||  || — || September 24, 2005 || Kitt Peak || Spacewatch || KOR || align=right | 1.6 km || 
|-id=686 bgcolor=#d6d6d6
| 184686 ||  || — || September 24, 2005 || Kitt Peak || Spacewatch || KOR || align=right | 1.6 km || 
|-id=687 bgcolor=#d6d6d6
| 184687 ||  || — || September 24, 2005 || Kitt Peak || Spacewatch || CRO || align=right | 5.4 km || 
|-id=688 bgcolor=#E9E9E9
| 184688 ||  || — || September 24, 2005 || Kitt Peak || Spacewatch || — || align=right | 3.0 km || 
|-id=689 bgcolor=#E9E9E9
| 184689 ||  || — || September 25, 2005 || Kitt Peak || Spacewatch || HEN || align=right | 1.3 km || 
|-id=690 bgcolor=#d6d6d6
| 184690 ||  || — || September 25, 2005 || Kitt Peak || Spacewatch || — || align=right | 3.2 km || 
|-id=691 bgcolor=#fefefe
| 184691 ||  || — || September 25, 2005 || Palomar || NEAT || FLO || align=right | 1.1 km || 
|-id=692 bgcolor=#d6d6d6
| 184692 ||  || — || September 25, 2005 || Kitt Peak || Spacewatch || — || align=right | 5.0 km || 
|-id=693 bgcolor=#E9E9E9
| 184693 ||  || — || September 25, 2005 || Palomar || NEAT || AGN || align=right | 2.0 km || 
|-id=694 bgcolor=#d6d6d6
| 184694 ||  || — || September 25, 2005 || Kitt Peak || Spacewatch || — || align=right | 4.6 km || 
|-id=695 bgcolor=#d6d6d6
| 184695 ||  || — || September 25, 2005 || Kitt Peak || Spacewatch || — || align=right | 4.3 km || 
|-id=696 bgcolor=#E9E9E9
| 184696 ||  || — || September 26, 2005 || Kitt Peak || Spacewatch || — || align=right | 1.8 km || 
|-id=697 bgcolor=#E9E9E9
| 184697 ||  || — || September 27, 2005 || Kitt Peak || Spacewatch || — || align=right | 3.4 km || 
|-id=698 bgcolor=#d6d6d6
| 184698 ||  || — || September 27, 2005 || Kitt Peak || Spacewatch || — || align=right | 4.3 km || 
|-id=699 bgcolor=#d6d6d6
| 184699 ||  || — || September 27, 2005 || Kitt Peak || Spacewatch || — || align=right | 4.6 km || 
|-id=700 bgcolor=#d6d6d6
| 184700 ||  || — || September 27, 2005 || Kitt Peak || Spacewatch || — || align=right | 3.5 km || 
|}

184701–184800 

|-bgcolor=#E9E9E9
| 184701 ||  || — || September 28, 2005 || Palomar || NEAT || — || align=right | 2.7 km || 
|-id=702 bgcolor=#E9E9E9
| 184702 ||  || — || September 29, 2005 || Kitt Peak || Spacewatch || — || align=right | 3.2 km || 
|-id=703 bgcolor=#E9E9E9
| 184703 ||  || — || September 29, 2005 || Palomar || NEAT || — || align=right | 3.2 km || 
|-id=704 bgcolor=#d6d6d6
| 184704 ||  || — || September 29, 2005 || Anderson Mesa || LONEOS || — || align=right | 4.5 km || 
|-id=705 bgcolor=#E9E9E9
| 184705 ||  || — || September 29, 2005 || Anderson Mesa || LONEOS || — || align=right | 3.3 km || 
|-id=706 bgcolor=#E9E9E9
| 184706 ||  || — || September 29, 2005 || Mount Lemmon || Mount Lemmon Survey || — || align=right | 3.7 km || 
|-id=707 bgcolor=#E9E9E9
| 184707 ||  || — || September 29, 2005 || Kitt Peak || Spacewatch || — || align=right | 2.8 km || 
|-id=708 bgcolor=#E9E9E9
| 184708 ||  || — || September 30, 2005 || Calvin-Rehoboth || L. A. Molnar || HEN || align=right | 1.4 km || 
|-id=709 bgcolor=#d6d6d6
| 184709 ||  || — || September 25, 2005 || Kitt Peak || Spacewatch || — || align=right | 4.4 km || 
|-id=710 bgcolor=#E9E9E9
| 184710 ||  || — || September 25, 2005 || Kitt Peak || Spacewatch || GEF || align=right | 1.7 km || 
|-id=711 bgcolor=#E9E9E9
| 184711 ||  || — || September 25, 2005 || Kitt Peak || Spacewatch || HEN || align=right | 1.2 km || 
|-id=712 bgcolor=#d6d6d6
| 184712 ||  || — || September 25, 2005 || Kitt Peak || Spacewatch || — || align=right | 3.7 km || 
|-id=713 bgcolor=#d6d6d6
| 184713 ||  || — || September 25, 2005 || Kitt Peak || Spacewatch || — || align=right | 3.3 km || 
|-id=714 bgcolor=#d6d6d6
| 184714 ||  || — || September 25, 2005 || Kitt Peak || Spacewatch || THM || align=right | 3.3 km || 
|-id=715 bgcolor=#E9E9E9
| 184715 ||  || — || September 25, 2005 || Kitt Peak || Spacewatch || — || align=right | 1.2 km || 
|-id=716 bgcolor=#fefefe
| 184716 ||  || — || September 26, 2005 || Socorro || LINEAR || — || align=right | 2.0 km || 
|-id=717 bgcolor=#d6d6d6
| 184717 ||  || — || September 26, 2005 || Kitt Peak || Spacewatch || — || align=right | 2.6 km || 
|-id=718 bgcolor=#d6d6d6
| 184718 ||  || — || September 27, 2005 || Kitt Peak || Spacewatch || — || align=right | 4.2 km || 
|-id=719 bgcolor=#d6d6d6
| 184719 ||  || — || September 27, 2005 || Kitt Peak || Spacewatch || — || align=right | 3.2 km || 
|-id=720 bgcolor=#d6d6d6
| 184720 ||  || — || September 27, 2005 || Kitt Peak || Spacewatch || — || align=right | 4.3 km || 
|-id=721 bgcolor=#E9E9E9
| 184721 ||  || — || September 27, 2005 || Kitt Peak || Spacewatch || — || align=right | 2.1 km || 
|-id=722 bgcolor=#E9E9E9
| 184722 ||  || — || September 27, 2005 || Palomar || NEAT || — || align=right | 2.4 km || 
|-id=723 bgcolor=#d6d6d6
| 184723 ||  || — || September 28, 2005 || Palomar || NEAT || — || align=right | 4.5 km || 
|-id=724 bgcolor=#fefefe
| 184724 ||  || — || September 28, 2005 || Palomar || NEAT || — || align=right | 3.3 km || 
|-id=725 bgcolor=#d6d6d6
| 184725 ||  || — || September 29, 2005 || Anderson Mesa || LONEOS || — || align=right | 4.4 km || 
|-id=726 bgcolor=#d6d6d6
| 184726 ||  || — || September 29, 2005 || Kitt Peak || Spacewatch || — || align=right | 2.9 km || 
|-id=727 bgcolor=#d6d6d6
| 184727 ||  || — || September 29, 2005 || Anderson Mesa || LONEOS || — || align=right | 4.5 km || 
|-id=728 bgcolor=#E9E9E9
| 184728 ||  || — || September 29, 2005 || Kitt Peak || Spacewatch || — || align=right | 3.5 km || 
|-id=729 bgcolor=#E9E9E9
| 184729 ||  || — || September 29, 2005 || Anderson Mesa || LONEOS || WIT || align=right | 1.2 km || 
|-id=730 bgcolor=#d6d6d6
| 184730 ||  || — || September 29, 2005 || Mount Lemmon || Mount Lemmon Survey || EOS || align=right | 2.4 km || 
|-id=731 bgcolor=#d6d6d6
| 184731 ||  || — || September 29, 2005 || Kitt Peak || Spacewatch || — || align=right | 3.4 km || 
|-id=732 bgcolor=#d6d6d6
| 184732 ||  || — || September 29, 2005 || Kitt Peak || Spacewatch || — || align=right | 4.3 km || 
|-id=733 bgcolor=#E9E9E9
| 184733 ||  || — || September 29, 2005 || Palomar || NEAT || PAD || align=right | 2.6 km || 
|-id=734 bgcolor=#d6d6d6
| 184734 ||  || — || September 29, 2005 || Mount Lemmon || Mount Lemmon Survey || — || align=right | 3.5 km || 
|-id=735 bgcolor=#d6d6d6
| 184735 ||  || — || September 29, 2005 || Mount Lemmon || Mount Lemmon Survey || — || align=right | 4.3 km || 
|-id=736 bgcolor=#fefefe
| 184736 ||  || — || September 30, 2005 || Anderson Mesa || LONEOS || NYS || align=right data-sort-value="0.89" | 890 m || 
|-id=737 bgcolor=#E9E9E9
| 184737 ||  || — || September 30, 2005 || Anderson Mesa || LONEOS || HNA || align=right | 3.5 km || 
|-id=738 bgcolor=#d6d6d6
| 184738 ||  || — || September 30, 2005 || Kitt Peak || Spacewatch || EOS || align=right | 2.9 km || 
|-id=739 bgcolor=#d6d6d6
| 184739 ||  || — || September 30, 2005 || Palomar || NEAT || EOS || align=right | 3.8 km || 
|-id=740 bgcolor=#E9E9E9
| 184740 ||  || — || September 30, 2005 || Palomar || NEAT || EUN || align=right | 2.7 km || 
|-id=741 bgcolor=#E9E9E9
| 184741 ||  || — || September 30, 2005 || Palomar || NEAT || HOF || align=right | 5.2 km || 
|-id=742 bgcolor=#d6d6d6
| 184742 ||  || — || September 29, 2005 || Mount Lemmon || Mount Lemmon Survey || — || align=right | 4.1 km || 
|-id=743 bgcolor=#d6d6d6
| 184743 ||  || — || September 30, 2005 || Mount Lemmon || Mount Lemmon Survey || — || align=right | 3.1 km || 
|-id=744 bgcolor=#E9E9E9
| 184744 ||  || — || September 29, 2005 || Kitt Peak || Spacewatch || — || align=right | 3.2 km || 
|-id=745 bgcolor=#d6d6d6
| 184745 ||  || — || September 30, 2005 || Mount Lemmon || Mount Lemmon Survey || — || align=right | 3.2 km || 
|-id=746 bgcolor=#d6d6d6
| 184746 ||  || — || September 30, 2005 || Kitt Peak || Spacewatch || EOS || align=right | 2.1 km || 
|-id=747 bgcolor=#d6d6d6
| 184747 ||  || — || September 30, 2005 || Kitt Peak || Spacewatch || URS || align=right | 5.6 km || 
|-id=748 bgcolor=#d6d6d6
| 184748 ||  || — || September 30, 2005 || Kitt Peak || Spacewatch || EOS || align=right | 2.6 km || 
|-id=749 bgcolor=#E9E9E9
| 184749 ||  || — || September 30, 2005 || Kitt Peak || Spacewatch || — || align=right | 2.3 km || 
|-id=750 bgcolor=#E9E9E9
| 184750 ||  || — || September 30, 2005 || Mount Lemmon || Mount Lemmon Survey || — || align=right | 1.9 km || 
|-id=751 bgcolor=#E9E9E9
| 184751 ||  || — || September 23, 2005 || Kitt Peak || Spacewatch || HEN || align=right | 1.8 km || 
|-id=752 bgcolor=#E9E9E9
| 184752 ||  || — || September 24, 2005 || Palomar || NEAT || — || align=right | 2.9 km || 
|-id=753 bgcolor=#E9E9E9
| 184753 ||  || — || September 24, 2005 || Palomar || NEAT || — || align=right | 2.9 km || 
|-id=754 bgcolor=#d6d6d6
| 184754 ||  || — || September 30, 2005 || Mount Lemmon || Mount Lemmon Survey || EOS || align=right | 4.2 km || 
|-id=755 bgcolor=#d6d6d6
| 184755 ||  || — || September 22, 2005 || Palomar || NEAT || — || align=right | 4.1 km || 
|-id=756 bgcolor=#E9E9E9
| 184756 ||  || — || September 22, 2005 || Palomar || NEAT || — || align=right | 1.6 km || 
|-id=757 bgcolor=#d6d6d6
| 184757 ||  || — || September 22, 2005 || Palomar || NEAT || HYG || align=right | 3.8 km || 
|-id=758 bgcolor=#d6d6d6
| 184758 ||  || — || September 22, 2005 || Palomar || NEAT || — || align=right | 5.1 km || 
|-id=759 bgcolor=#d6d6d6
| 184759 ||  || — || September 23, 2005 || Kitt Peak || Spacewatch || — || align=right | 3.2 km || 
|-id=760 bgcolor=#E9E9E9
| 184760 ||  || — || September 29, 2005 || Anderson Mesa || LONEOS || HOF || align=right | 3.7 km || 
|-id=761 bgcolor=#E9E9E9
| 184761 ||  || — || September 24, 2005 || Palomar || NEAT || AGN || align=right | 2.1 km || 
|-id=762 bgcolor=#d6d6d6
| 184762 ||  || — || September 23, 2005 || Kitt Peak || Spacewatch || HYG || align=right | 3.9 km || 
|-id=763 bgcolor=#d6d6d6
| 184763 ||  || — || September 26, 2005 || Kitt Peak || Spacewatch || — || align=right | 3.9 km || 
|-id=764 bgcolor=#E9E9E9
| 184764 ||  || — || September 23, 2005 || Catalina || CSS || — || align=right | 2.2 km || 
|-id=765 bgcolor=#E9E9E9
| 184765 ||  || — || September 25, 2005 || Apache Point || A. C. Becker || — || align=right | 2.9 km || 
|-id=766 bgcolor=#E9E9E9
| 184766 ||  || — || October 1, 2005 || Anderson Mesa || LONEOS || JUN || align=right | 1.3 km || 
|-id=767 bgcolor=#E9E9E9
| 184767 ||  || — || October 1, 2005 || Mount Lemmon || Mount Lemmon Survey || AST || align=right | 2.4 km || 
|-id=768 bgcolor=#d6d6d6
| 184768 ||  || — || October 1, 2005 || Kitt Peak || Spacewatch || — || align=right | 3.3 km || 
|-id=769 bgcolor=#d6d6d6
| 184769 ||  || — || October 1, 2005 || Kitt Peak || Spacewatch || — || align=right | 4.0 km || 
|-id=770 bgcolor=#E9E9E9
| 184770 ||  || — || October 1, 2005 || Mount Lemmon || Mount Lemmon Survey || — || align=right | 3.6 km || 
|-id=771 bgcolor=#d6d6d6
| 184771 ||  || — || October 2, 2005 || Palomar || NEAT || — || align=right | 4.8 km || 
|-id=772 bgcolor=#d6d6d6
| 184772 ||  || — || October 1, 2005 || Socorro || LINEAR || — || align=right | 4.1 km || 
|-id=773 bgcolor=#E9E9E9
| 184773 ||  || — || October 1, 2005 || Mount Lemmon || Mount Lemmon Survey || AGN || align=right | 1.8 km || 
|-id=774 bgcolor=#d6d6d6
| 184774 ||  || — || October 1, 2005 || Kitt Peak || Spacewatch || KOR || align=right | 2.2 km || 
|-id=775 bgcolor=#d6d6d6
| 184775 ||  || — || October 1, 2005 || Socorro || LINEAR || HYG || align=right | 3.6 km || 
|-id=776 bgcolor=#E9E9E9
| 184776 ||  || — || October 1, 2005 || Socorro || LINEAR || — || align=right | 3.4 km || 
|-id=777 bgcolor=#d6d6d6
| 184777 ||  || — || October 1, 2005 || Mount Lemmon || Mount Lemmon Survey || — || align=right | 4.0 km || 
|-id=778 bgcolor=#E9E9E9
| 184778 Kevinoberheim ||  ||  || October 1, 2005 || Catalina || R. A. Kowalski || WIT || align=right | 1.6 km || 
|-id=779 bgcolor=#d6d6d6
| 184779 Bericoberheim ||  ||  || October 1, 2005 || Catalina || R. A. Kowalski || — || align=right | 4.1 km || 
|-id=780 bgcolor=#d6d6d6
| 184780 ||  || — || October 1, 2005 || Mount Lemmon || Mount Lemmon Survey || 3:2 || align=right | 6.7 km || 
|-id=781 bgcolor=#d6d6d6
| 184781 ||  || — || October 4, 2005 || Palomar || NEAT || THM || align=right | 3.1 km || 
|-id=782 bgcolor=#E9E9E9
| 184782 ||  || — || October 1, 2005 || Kitt Peak || Spacewatch || — || align=right | 2.2 km || 
|-id=783 bgcolor=#E9E9E9
| 184783 ||  || — || October 1, 2005 || Kitt Peak || Spacewatch || — || align=right | 1.6 km || 
|-id=784 bgcolor=#d6d6d6
| 184784 Bettiepage ||  ||  || October 3, 2005 || Catalina || CSS || — || align=right | 3.7 km || 
|-id=785 bgcolor=#E9E9E9
| 184785 ||  || — || October 5, 2005 || Kitt Peak || Spacewatch || MIS || align=right | 3.9 km || 
|-id=786 bgcolor=#d6d6d6
| 184786 ||  || — || October 8, 2005 || Moletai || K. Černis, J. Zdanavičius || — || align=right | 2.4 km || 
|-id=787 bgcolor=#E9E9E9
| 184787 ||  || — || October 1, 2005 || Kitt Peak || Spacewatch || — || align=right | 3.5 km || 
|-id=788 bgcolor=#d6d6d6
| 184788 ||  || — || October 5, 2005 || Kitt Peak || Spacewatch || HYG || align=right | 5.1 km || 
|-id=789 bgcolor=#d6d6d6
| 184789 ||  || — || October 1, 2005 || Mount Lemmon || Mount Lemmon Survey || THM || align=right | 4.3 km || 
|-id=790 bgcolor=#d6d6d6
| 184790 ||  || — || October 1, 2005 || Mount Lemmon || Mount Lemmon Survey || — || align=right | 2.3 km || 
|-id=791 bgcolor=#d6d6d6
| 184791 ||  || — || October 1, 2005 || Mount Lemmon || Mount Lemmon Survey || — || align=right | 3.1 km || 
|-id=792 bgcolor=#d6d6d6
| 184792 ||  || — || October 6, 2005 || Anderson Mesa || LONEOS || — || align=right | 4.2 km || 
|-id=793 bgcolor=#d6d6d6
| 184793 ||  || — || October 6, 2005 || Mount Lemmon || Mount Lemmon Survey || KAR || align=right | 1.2 km || 
|-id=794 bgcolor=#d6d6d6
| 184794 ||  || — || October 6, 2005 || Mount Lemmon || Mount Lemmon Survey || — || align=right | 2.9 km || 
|-id=795 bgcolor=#E9E9E9
| 184795 ||  || — || October 1, 2005 || Anderson Mesa || LONEOS || — || align=right | 3.3 km || 
|-id=796 bgcolor=#d6d6d6
| 184796 ||  || — || October 3, 2005 || Kitt Peak || Spacewatch || — || align=right | 3.9 km || 
|-id=797 bgcolor=#d6d6d6
| 184797 ||  || — || October 3, 2005 || Kitt Peak || Spacewatch || — || align=right | 4.2 km || 
|-id=798 bgcolor=#E9E9E9
| 184798 ||  || — || October 5, 2005 || Kitt Peak || Spacewatch || — || align=right | 1.8 km || 
|-id=799 bgcolor=#E9E9E9
| 184799 ||  || — || October 5, 2005 || Kitt Peak || Spacewatch || — || align=right | 2.0 km || 
|-id=800 bgcolor=#d6d6d6
| 184800 ||  || — || October 7, 2005 || Mount Lemmon || Mount Lemmon Survey || — || align=right | 3.4 km || 
|}

184801–184900 

|-bgcolor=#E9E9E9
| 184801 ||  || — || October 7, 2005 || Catalina || CSS || — || align=right | 2.9 km || 
|-id=802 bgcolor=#d6d6d6
| 184802 ||  || — || October 7, 2005 || Catalina || CSS || EMA || align=right | 5.2 km || 
|-id=803 bgcolor=#d6d6d6
| 184803 ||  || — || October 7, 2005 || Kitt Peak || Spacewatch || — || align=right | 5.3 km || 
|-id=804 bgcolor=#d6d6d6
| 184804 ||  || — || October 7, 2005 || Kitt Peak || Spacewatch || HYG || align=right | 3.9 km || 
|-id=805 bgcolor=#d6d6d6
| 184805 ||  || — || October 7, 2005 || Kitt Peak || Spacewatch || KOR || align=right | 2.1 km || 
|-id=806 bgcolor=#d6d6d6
| 184806 ||  || — || October 7, 2005 || Kitt Peak || Spacewatch || THM || align=right | 3.3 km || 
|-id=807 bgcolor=#d6d6d6
| 184807 ||  || — || October 7, 2005 || Kitt Peak || Spacewatch || — || align=right | 2.5 km || 
|-id=808 bgcolor=#d6d6d6
| 184808 ||  || — || October 7, 2005 || Kitt Peak || Spacewatch || THM || align=right | 3.0 km || 
|-id=809 bgcolor=#d6d6d6
| 184809 ||  || — || October 7, 2005 || Kitt Peak || Spacewatch || KOR || align=right | 1.9 km || 
|-id=810 bgcolor=#d6d6d6
| 184810 ||  || — || October 7, 2005 || Kitt Peak || Spacewatch || — || align=right | 3.5 km || 
|-id=811 bgcolor=#d6d6d6
| 184811 ||  || — || October 7, 2005 || Kitt Peak || Spacewatch || HYG || align=right | 3.3 km || 
|-id=812 bgcolor=#d6d6d6
| 184812 ||  || — || October 7, 2005 || Kitt Peak || Spacewatch || KAR || align=right | 1.5 km || 
|-id=813 bgcolor=#d6d6d6
| 184813 ||  || — || October 7, 2005 || Kitt Peak || Spacewatch || EOS || align=right | 4.4 km || 
|-id=814 bgcolor=#E9E9E9
| 184814 ||  || — || October 5, 2005 || Socorro || LINEAR || — || align=right | 3.1 km || 
|-id=815 bgcolor=#E9E9E9
| 184815 ||  || — || October 6, 2005 || Kitt Peak || Spacewatch || — || align=right | 2.0 km || 
|-id=816 bgcolor=#E9E9E9
| 184816 ||  || — || October 6, 2005 || Kitt Peak || Spacewatch || VIB || align=right | 2.9 km || 
|-id=817 bgcolor=#d6d6d6
| 184817 ||  || — || October 8, 2005 || Kitt Peak || Spacewatch || — || align=right | 3.0 km || 
|-id=818 bgcolor=#d6d6d6
| 184818 ||  || — || October 8, 2005 || Kitt Peak || Spacewatch || KOR || align=right | 1.6 km || 
|-id=819 bgcolor=#d6d6d6
| 184819 ||  || — || October 9, 2005 || Kitt Peak || Spacewatch || — || align=right | 3.4 km || 
|-id=820 bgcolor=#d6d6d6
| 184820 ||  || — || October 9, 2005 || Kitt Peak || Spacewatch || — || align=right | 3.5 km || 
|-id=821 bgcolor=#d6d6d6
| 184821 ||  || — || October 9, 2005 || Kitt Peak || Spacewatch || — || align=right | 2.5 km || 
|-id=822 bgcolor=#d6d6d6
| 184822 ||  || — || October 9, 2005 || Kitt Peak || Spacewatch || 628 || align=right | 2.7 km || 
|-id=823 bgcolor=#d6d6d6
| 184823 ||  || — || October 12, 2005 || Kitt Peak || Spacewatch || — || align=right | 5.5 km || 
|-id=824 bgcolor=#d6d6d6
| 184824 ||  || — || October 1, 2005 || Catalina || CSS || EOS || align=right | 3.3 km || 
|-id=825 bgcolor=#d6d6d6
| 184825 ||  || — || October 5, 2005 || Mount Lemmon || Mount Lemmon Survey || — || align=right | 4.2 km || 
|-id=826 bgcolor=#E9E9E9
| 184826 ||  || — || October 1, 2005 || Catalina || CSS || EUN || align=right | 1.8 km || 
|-id=827 bgcolor=#E9E9E9
| 184827 ||  || — || October 1, 2005 || Kitt Peak || Spacewatch || — || align=right | 2.1 km || 
|-id=828 bgcolor=#d6d6d6
| 184828 ||  || — || October 3, 2005 || Catalina || CSS || — || align=right | 2.9 km || 
|-id=829 bgcolor=#C2FFFF
| 184829 || 2005 UJ || — || October 22, 2005 || Kitt Peak || Spacewatch || L5 || align=right | 13 km || 
|-id=830 bgcolor=#FA8072
| 184830 ||  || — || October 29, 2005 || Socorro || LINEAR || — || align=right | 1.6 km || 
|-id=831 bgcolor=#E9E9E9
| 184831 ||  || — || October 20, 2005 || Palomar || NEAT || — || align=right | 3.9 km || 
|-id=832 bgcolor=#d6d6d6
| 184832 ||  || — || October 21, 2005 || Palomar || NEAT || THM || align=right | 3.1 km || 
|-id=833 bgcolor=#d6d6d6
| 184833 ||  || — || October 21, 2005 || Palomar || NEAT || LIX || align=right | 4.9 km || 
|-id=834 bgcolor=#d6d6d6
| 184834 ||  || — || October 22, 2005 || Kitt Peak || Spacewatch || — || align=right | 4.4 km || 
|-id=835 bgcolor=#d6d6d6
| 184835 ||  || — || October 23, 2005 || Kitt Peak || Spacewatch || HYG || align=right | 3.7 km || 
|-id=836 bgcolor=#d6d6d6
| 184836 ||  || — || October 23, 2005 || Kitt Peak || Spacewatch || — || align=right | 5.2 km || 
|-id=837 bgcolor=#d6d6d6
| 184837 ||  || — || October 23, 2005 || Kitt Peak || Spacewatch || — || align=right | 3.4 km || 
|-id=838 bgcolor=#d6d6d6
| 184838 ||  || — || October 24, 2005 || Kitt Peak || Spacewatch || — || align=right | 5.4 km || 
|-id=839 bgcolor=#d6d6d6
| 184839 ||  || — || October 24, 2005 || Kitt Peak || Spacewatch || — || align=right | 3.3 km || 
|-id=840 bgcolor=#d6d6d6
| 184840 ||  || — || October 24, 2005 || Kitt Peak || Spacewatch || — || align=right | 6.2 km || 
|-id=841 bgcolor=#d6d6d6
| 184841 ||  || — || October 24, 2005 || Kitt Peak || Spacewatch || — || align=right | 3.7 km || 
|-id=842 bgcolor=#d6d6d6
| 184842 ||  || — || October 24, 2005 || Kitt Peak || Spacewatch || HYG || align=right | 4.8 km || 
|-id=843 bgcolor=#d6d6d6
| 184843 ||  || — || October 22, 2005 || Kitt Peak || Spacewatch || — || align=right | 4.8 km || 
|-id=844 bgcolor=#E9E9E9
| 184844 ||  || — || October 22, 2005 || Kitt Peak || Spacewatch || — || align=right | 2.8 km || 
|-id=845 bgcolor=#E9E9E9
| 184845 ||  || — || October 22, 2005 || Catalina || CSS || — || align=right | 4.2 km || 
|-id=846 bgcolor=#E9E9E9
| 184846 ||  || — || October 22, 2005 || Catalina || CSS || — || align=right | 2.2 km || 
|-id=847 bgcolor=#d6d6d6
| 184847 ||  || — || October 22, 2005 || Catalina || CSS || KOR || align=right | 2.1 km || 
|-id=848 bgcolor=#d6d6d6
| 184848 ||  || — || October 23, 2005 || Catalina || CSS || — || align=right | 7.3 km || 
|-id=849 bgcolor=#d6d6d6
| 184849 ||  || — || October 23, 2005 || Catalina || CSS || — || align=right | 3.4 km || 
|-id=850 bgcolor=#d6d6d6
| 184850 ||  || — || October 23, 2005 || Catalina || CSS || HYG || align=right | 5.7 km || 
|-id=851 bgcolor=#E9E9E9
| 184851 ||  || — || October 23, 2005 || Catalina || CSS || — || align=right | 2.3 km || 
|-id=852 bgcolor=#d6d6d6
| 184852 ||  || — || October 23, 2005 || Catalina || CSS || — || align=right | 3.1 km || 
|-id=853 bgcolor=#d6d6d6
| 184853 ||  || — || October 24, 2005 || Kitt Peak || Spacewatch || — || align=right | 4.8 km || 
|-id=854 bgcolor=#E9E9E9
| 184854 ||  || — || October 24, 2005 || Anderson Mesa || LONEOS || — || align=right | 3.3 km || 
|-id=855 bgcolor=#d6d6d6
| 184855 ||  || — || October 24, 2005 || Kitt Peak || Spacewatch || — || align=right | 3.7 km || 
|-id=856 bgcolor=#d6d6d6
| 184856 ||  || — || October 25, 2005 || Mount Lemmon || Mount Lemmon Survey || — || align=right | 4.0 km || 
|-id=857 bgcolor=#d6d6d6
| 184857 ||  || — || October 22, 2005 || Catalina || CSS || 3:2 || align=right | 9.4 km || 
|-id=858 bgcolor=#E9E9E9
| 184858 ||  || — || October 22, 2005 || Palomar || NEAT || — || align=right | 3.7 km || 
|-id=859 bgcolor=#d6d6d6
| 184859 ||  || — || October 23, 2005 || Palomar || NEAT || — || align=right | 4.7 km || 
|-id=860 bgcolor=#d6d6d6
| 184860 ||  || — || October 22, 2005 || Kitt Peak || Spacewatch || KOR || align=right | 1.5 km || 
|-id=861 bgcolor=#d6d6d6
| 184861 ||  || — || October 22, 2005 || Kitt Peak || Spacewatch || — || align=right | 3.3 km || 
|-id=862 bgcolor=#d6d6d6
| 184862 ||  || — || October 22, 2005 || Kitt Peak || Spacewatch || — || align=right | 3.7 km || 
|-id=863 bgcolor=#d6d6d6
| 184863 ||  || — || October 22, 2005 || Kitt Peak || Spacewatch || — || align=right | 3.7 km || 
|-id=864 bgcolor=#E9E9E9
| 184864 ||  || — || October 22, 2005 || Kitt Peak || Spacewatch || — || align=right | 3.3 km || 
|-id=865 bgcolor=#d6d6d6
| 184865 ||  || — || October 22, 2005 || Kitt Peak || Spacewatch || — || align=right | 3.4 km || 
|-id=866 bgcolor=#d6d6d6
| 184866 ||  || — || October 22, 2005 || Kitt Peak || Spacewatch || EOS || align=right | 4.0 km || 
|-id=867 bgcolor=#d6d6d6
| 184867 ||  || — || October 22, 2005 || Palomar || NEAT || — || align=right | 5.3 km || 
|-id=868 bgcolor=#d6d6d6
| 184868 ||  || — || October 22, 2005 || Kitt Peak || Spacewatch || KOR || align=right | 1.6 km || 
|-id=869 bgcolor=#E9E9E9
| 184869 ||  || — || October 22, 2005 || Palomar || NEAT || — || align=right | 3.8 km || 
|-id=870 bgcolor=#E9E9E9
| 184870 ||  || — || October 23, 2005 || Palomar || NEAT || — || align=right | 2.8 km || 
|-id=871 bgcolor=#d6d6d6
| 184871 ||  || — || October 24, 2005 || Kitt Peak || Spacewatch || — || align=right | 4.2 km || 
|-id=872 bgcolor=#d6d6d6
| 184872 ||  || — || October 24, 2005 || Kitt Peak || Spacewatch || 3:2 || align=right | 5.0 km || 
|-id=873 bgcolor=#E9E9E9
| 184873 ||  || — || October 25, 2005 || Mount Lemmon || Mount Lemmon Survey || — || align=right | 1.4 km || 
|-id=874 bgcolor=#E9E9E9
| 184874 ||  || — || October 22, 2005 || Catalina || CSS || — || align=right | 2.3 km || 
|-id=875 bgcolor=#E9E9E9
| 184875 ||  || — || October 24, 2005 || Kitt Peak || Spacewatch || HNA || align=right | 2.9 km || 
|-id=876 bgcolor=#d6d6d6
| 184876 ||  || — || October 24, 2005 || Kitt Peak || Spacewatch || HYG || align=right | 3.8 km || 
|-id=877 bgcolor=#d6d6d6
| 184877 ||  || — || October 24, 2005 || Kitt Peak || Spacewatch || — || align=right | 4.7 km || 
|-id=878 bgcolor=#d6d6d6
| 184878 Gotlib ||  ||  || October 26, 2005 || Nogales || J.-C. Merlin || — || align=right | 2.9 km || 
|-id=879 bgcolor=#E9E9E9
| 184879 ||  || — || October 22, 2005 || Kitt Peak || Spacewatch || AGN || align=right | 1.4 km || 
|-id=880 bgcolor=#E9E9E9
| 184880 ||  || — || October 25, 2005 || Mount Lemmon || Mount Lemmon Survey || — || align=right | 3.0 km || 
|-id=881 bgcolor=#d6d6d6
| 184881 ||  || — || October 27, 2005 || Kitt Peak || Spacewatch || THM || align=right | 2.6 km || 
|-id=882 bgcolor=#d6d6d6
| 184882 ||  || — || October 27, 2005 || Mount Lemmon || Mount Lemmon Survey || — || align=right | 3.7 km || 
|-id=883 bgcolor=#E9E9E9
| 184883 ||  || — || October 22, 2005 || Palomar || NEAT || — || align=right | 2.3 km || 
|-id=884 bgcolor=#d6d6d6
| 184884 ||  || — || October 24, 2005 || Palomar || NEAT || — || align=right | 2.1 km || 
|-id=885 bgcolor=#fefefe
| 184885 ||  || — || October 27, 2005 || Palomar || NEAT || — || align=right | 1.6 km || 
|-id=886 bgcolor=#d6d6d6
| 184886 ||  || — || October 25, 2005 || Kitt Peak || Spacewatch || HYG || align=right | 3.7 km || 
|-id=887 bgcolor=#d6d6d6
| 184887 ||  || — || October 25, 2005 || Kitt Peak || Spacewatch || THM || align=right | 2.6 km || 
|-id=888 bgcolor=#d6d6d6
| 184888 ||  || — || October 25, 2005 || Kitt Peak || Spacewatch || — || align=right | 5.1 km || 
|-id=889 bgcolor=#d6d6d6
| 184889 ||  || — || October 25, 2005 || Kitt Peak || Spacewatch || — || align=right | 5.1 km || 
|-id=890 bgcolor=#d6d6d6
| 184890 ||  || — || October 25, 2005 || Kitt Peak || Spacewatch || — || align=right | 3.3 km || 
|-id=891 bgcolor=#d6d6d6
| 184891 ||  || — || October 25, 2005 || Kitt Peak || Spacewatch || — || align=right | 4.2 km || 
|-id=892 bgcolor=#d6d6d6
| 184892 ||  || — || October 25, 2005 || Kitt Peak || Spacewatch || HYG || align=right | 3.0 km || 
|-id=893 bgcolor=#d6d6d6
| 184893 ||  || — || October 27, 2005 || Anderson Mesa || LONEOS || TEL || align=right | 2.0 km || 
|-id=894 bgcolor=#d6d6d6
| 184894 ||  || — || October 22, 2005 || Kitt Peak || Spacewatch || — || align=right | 3.0 km || 
|-id=895 bgcolor=#d6d6d6
| 184895 ||  || — || October 24, 2005 || Kitt Peak || Spacewatch || — || align=right | 5.3 km || 
|-id=896 bgcolor=#d6d6d6
| 184896 ||  || — || October 25, 2005 || Kitt Peak || Spacewatch || KOR || align=right | 1.8 km || 
|-id=897 bgcolor=#E9E9E9
| 184897 ||  || — || October 25, 2005 || Mount Lemmon || Mount Lemmon Survey || NEM || align=right | 3.3 km || 
|-id=898 bgcolor=#d6d6d6
| 184898 ||  || — || October 27, 2005 || Kitt Peak || Spacewatch || KOR || align=right | 1.8 km || 
|-id=899 bgcolor=#d6d6d6
| 184899 ||  || — || October 27, 2005 || Kitt Peak || Spacewatch || — || align=right | 2.8 km || 
|-id=900 bgcolor=#E9E9E9
| 184900 ||  || — || October 28, 2005 || Mount Lemmon || Mount Lemmon Survey || EUN || align=right | 2.2 km || 
|}

184901–185000 

|-bgcolor=#d6d6d6
| 184901 ||  || — || October 24, 2005 || Kitt Peak || Spacewatch || — || align=right | 3.6 km || 
|-id=902 bgcolor=#d6d6d6
| 184902 ||  || — || October 26, 2005 || Kitt Peak || Spacewatch || VER || align=right | 4.4 km || 
|-id=903 bgcolor=#d6d6d6
| 184903 ||  || — || October 29, 2005 || Mount Lemmon || Mount Lemmon Survey || — || align=right | 5.1 km || 
|-id=904 bgcolor=#d6d6d6
| 184904 ||  || — || October 27, 2005 || Kitt Peak || Spacewatch || — || align=right | 3.5 km || 
|-id=905 bgcolor=#d6d6d6
| 184905 ||  || — || October 29, 2005 || Mount Lemmon || Mount Lemmon Survey || THM || align=right | 3.4 km || 
|-id=906 bgcolor=#E9E9E9
| 184906 ||  || — || October 30, 2005 || Mount Lemmon || Mount Lemmon Survey || — || align=right | 1.8 km || 
|-id=907 bgcolor=#E9E9E9
| 184907 ||  || — || October 29, 2005 || Mount Lemmon || Mount Lemmon Survey || — || align=right | 3.3 km || 
|-id=908 bgcolor=#d6d6d6
| 184908 ||  || — || October 25, 2005 || Catalina || CSS || — || align=right | 3.3 km || 
|-id=909 bgcolor=#d6d6d6
| 184909 ||  || — || October 29, 2005 || Catalina || CSS || EOS || align=right | 3.1 km || 
|-id=910 bgcolor=#E9E9E9
| 184910 ||  || — || October 27, 2005 || Kitt Peak || Spacewatch || HEN || align=right | 1.7 km || 
|-id=911 bgcolor=#d6d6d6
| 184911 ||  || — || October 27, 2005 || Kitt Peak || Spacewatch || — || align=right | 4.8 km || 
|-id=912 bgcolor=#d6d6d6
| 184912 ||  || — || October 27, 2005 || Socorro || LINEAR || — || align=right | 3.8 km || 
|-id=913 bgcolor=#d6d6d6
| 184913 ||  || — || October 27, 2005 || Socorro || LINEAR || 7:4 || align=right | 5.7 km || 
|-id=914 bgcolor=#d6d6d6
| 184914 ||  || — || October 29, 2005 || Mount Lemmon || Mount Lemmon Survey || KOR || align=right | 1.5 km || 
|-id=915 bgcolor=#E9E9E9
| 184915 ||  || — || October 28, 2005 || Catalina || CSS || AGN || align=right | 1.9 km || 
|-id=916 bgcolor=#d6d6d6
| 184916 ||  || — || October 31, 2005 || Mount Lemmon || Mount Lemmon Survey || KOR || align=right | 1.7 km || 
|-id=917 bgcolor=#d6d6d6
| 184917 ||  || — || October 30, 2005 || Kitt Peak || Spacewatch || — || align=right | 3.4 km || 
|-id=918 bgcolor=#d6d6d6
| 184918 ||  || — || October 30, 2005 || Kitt Peak || Spacewatch || — || align=right | 3.1 km || 
|-id=919 bgcolor=#E9E9E9
| 184919 ||  || — || October 22, 2005 || Catalina || CSS || PAD || align=right | 2.4 km || 
|-id=920 bgcolor=#d6d6d6
| 184920 ||  || — || October 25, 2005 || Socorro || LINEAR || EOS || align=right | 3.2 km || 
|-id=921 bgcolor=#d6d6d6
| 184921 ||  || — || October 25, 2005 || Catalina || CSS || — || align=right | 4.2 km || 
|-id=922 bgcolor=#d6d6d6
| 184922 ||  || — || October 27, 2005 || Socorro || LINEAR || — || align=right | 3.8 km || 
|-id=923 bgcolor=#d6d6d6
| 184923 ||  || — || October 30, 2005 || Socorro || LINEAR || URS || align=right | 7.4 km || 
|-id=924 bgcolor=#d6d6d6
| 184924 ||  || — || October 25, 2005 || Catalina || CSS || HYG || align=right | 4.9 km || 
|-id=925 bgcolor=#d6d6d6
| 184925 ||  || — || October 27, 2005 || Anderson Mesa || LONEOS || — || align=right | 4.0 km || 
|-id=926 bgcolor=#d6d6d6
| 184926 ||  || — || October 25, 2005 || Apache Point || A. C. Becker || — || align=right | 3.1 km || 
|-id=927 bgcolor=#d6d6d6
| 184927 ||  || — || October 27, 2005 || Apache Point || A. C. Becker || TIR || align=right | 3.7 km || 
|-id=928 bgcolor=#d6d6d6
| 184928 ||  || — || October 27, 2005 || Apache Point || A. C. Becker || — || align=right | 3.7 km || 
|-id=929 bgcolor=#C2FFFF
| 184929 ||  || — || November 1, 2005 || Kitt Peak || Spacewatch || L5 || align=right | 13 km || 
|-id=930 bgcolor=#d6d6d6
| 184930 Gobbihilda ||  ||  || November 4, 2005 || Piszkéstető || K. Sárneczky || 3:2 || align=right | 5.9 km || 
|-id=931 bgcolor=#E9E9E9
| 184931 ||  || — || November 5, 2005 || Kitt Peak || Spacewatch || — || align=right | 2.5 km || 
|-id=932 bgcolor=#d6d6d6
| 184932 ||  || — || November 3, 2005 || Catalina || CSS || EOS || align=right | 7.4 km || 
|-id=933 bgcolor=#d6d6d6
| 184933 ||  || — || November 1, 2005 || Socorro || LINEAR || TEL || align=right | 3.1 km || 
|-id=934 bgcolor=#d6d6d6
| 184934 ||  || — || November 3, 2005 || Catalina || CSS || — || align=right | 4.4 km || 
|-id=935 bgcolor=#E9E9E9
| 184935 ||  || — || November 3, 2005 || Kitt Peak || Spacewatch || HEN || align=right | 1.4 km || 
|-id=936 bgcolor=#d6d6d6
| 184936 ||  || — || November 4, 2005 || Kitt Peak || Spacewatch || — || align=right | 3.7 km || 
|-id=937 bgcolor=#C2FFFF
| 184937 ||  || — || November 5, 2005 || Kitt Peak || Spacewatch || L5 || align=right | 15 km || 
|-id=938 bgcolor=#E9E9E9
| 184938 ||  || — || November 6, 2005 || Kitt Peak || Spacewatch || — || align=right | 3.0 km || 
|-id=939 bgcolor=#E9E9E9
| 184939 ||  || — || November 6, 2005 || Mount Lemmon || Mount Lemmon Survey || — || align=right | 3.7 km || 
|-id=940 bgcolor=#d6d6d6
| 184940 ||  || — || November 6, 2005 || Mount Lemmon || Mount Lemmon Survey || EOS || align=right | 3.3 km || 
|-id=941 bgcolor=#E9E9E9
| 184941 ||  || — || November 6, 2005 || Mount Lemmon || Mount Lemmon Survey || MRX || align=right | 2.1 km || 
|-id=942 bgcolor=#d6d6d6
| 184942 ||  || — || November 8, 2005 || Socorro || LINEAR || EOS || align=right | 3.5 km || 
|-id=943 bgcolor=#d6d6d6
| 184943 ||  || — || November 12, 2005 || Kitt Peak || Spacewatch || EOS || align=right | 3.1 km || 
|-id=944 bgcolor=#E9E9E9
| 184944 ||  || — || November 21, 2005 || Catalina || CSS || RAF || align=right | 1.5 km || 
|-id=945 bgcolor=#d6d6d6
| 184945 ||  || — || November 22, 2005 || Kitt Peak || Spacewatch || — || align=right | 3.9 km || 
|-id=946 bgcolor=#d6d6d6
| 184946 ||  || — || November 22, 2005 || Kitt Peak || Spacewatch || — || align=right | 3.1 km || 
|-id=947 bgcolor=#d6d6d6
| 184947 ||  || — || November 25, 2005 || Mount Lemmon || Mount Lemmon Survey || — || align=right | 3.7 km || 
|-id=948 bgcolor=#d6d6d6
| 184948 ||  || — || November 29, 2005 || Socorro || LINEAR || — || align=right | 5.0 km || 
|-id=949 bgcolor=#d6d6d6
| 184949 ||  || — || November 25, 2005 || Kitt Peak || Spacewatch || — || align=right | 4.7 km || 
|-id=950 bgcolor=#d6d6d6
| 184950 ||  || — || November 26, 2005 || Mount Lemmon || Mount Lemmon Survey || — || align=right | 3.7 km || 
|-id=951 bgcolor=#d6d6d6
| 184951 ||  || — || November 28, 2005 || Socorro || LINEAR || — || align=right | 5.4 km || 
|-id=952 bgcolor=#d6d6d6
| 184952 ||  || — || November 28, 2005 || Catalina || CSS || 3:2 || align=right | 5.9 km || 
|-id=953 bgcolor=#d6d6d6
| 184953 ||  || — || November 28, 2005 || Catalina || CSS || THM || align=right | 4.8 km || 
|-id=954 bgcolor=#d6d6d6
| 184954 ||  || — || November 28, 2005 || Catalina || CSS || — || align=right | 4.7 km || 
|-id=955 bgcolor=#d6d6d6
| 184955 ||  || — || November 29, 2005 || Socorro || LINEAR || SHU3:2 || align=right | 10 km || 
|-id=956 bgcolor=#d6d6d6
| 184956 ||  || — || November 28, 2005 || Catalina || CSS || — || align=right | 5.7 km || 
|-id=957 bgcolor=#E9E9E9
| 184957 ||  || — || November 25, 2005 || Mount Lemmon || Mount Lemmon Survey || NEM || align=right | 3.4 km || 
|-id=958 bgcolor=#d6d6d6
| 184958 ||  || — || November 30, 2005 || Socorro || LINEAR || — || align=right | 3.3 km || 
|-id=959 bgcolor=#d6d6d6
| 184959 ||  || — || November 25, 2005 || Mount Lemmon || Mount Lemmon Survey || EOS || align=right | 2.8 km || 
|-id=960 bgcolor=#d6d6d6
| 184960 ||  || — || November 25, 2005 || Mount Lemmon || Mount Lemmon Survey || — || align=right | 3.5 km || 
|-id=961 bgcolor=#d6d6d6
| 184961 ||  || — || November 25, 2005 || Kitt Peak || Spacewatch || SHU3:2 || align=right | 6.1 km || 
|-id=962 bgcolor=#d6d6d6
| 184962 ||  || — || November 28, 2005 || Catalina || CSS || — || align=right | 2.5 km || 
|-id=963 bgcolor=#d6d6d6
| 184963 ||  || — || November 29, 2005 || Palomar || NEAT || 3:2 || align=right | 7.5 km || 
|-id=964 bgcolor=#d6d6d6
| 184964 ||  || — || November 30, 2005 || Anderson Mesa || LONEOS || — || align=right | 3.5 km || 
|-id=965 bgcolor=#d6d6d6
| 184965 ||  || — || November 30, 2005 || Kitt Peak || Spacewatch || HYG || align=right | 3.7 km || 
|-id=966 bgcolor=#d6d6d6
| 184966 ||  || — || November 21, 2005 || Palomar || NEAT || — || align=right | 5.5 km || 
|-id=967 bgcolor=#d6d6d6
| 184967 ||  || — || November 25, 2005 || Catalina || CSS || — || align=right | 4.2 km || 
|-id=968 bgcolor=#d6d6d6
| 184968 ||  || — || November 25, 2005 || Catalina || CSS || VER || align=right | 6.8 km || 
|-id=969 bgcolor=#d6d6d6
| 184969 ||  || — || November 22, 2005 || Catalina || CSS || — || align=right | 4.8 km || 
|-id=970 bgcolor=#E9E9E9
| 184970 ||  || — || December 4, 2005 || Kitt Peak || Spacewatch || — || align=right | 1.6 km || 
|-id=971 bgcolor=#d6d6d6
| 184971 ||  || — || December 7, 2005 || Socorro || LINEAR || EOS || align=right | 6.8 km || 
|-id=972 bgcolor=#d6d6d6
| 184972 ||  || — || December 21, 2005 || Kitt Peak || Spacewatch || — || align=right | 4.1 km || 
|-id=973 bgcolor=#d6d6d6
| 184973 ||  || — || December 23, 2005 || Palomar || NEAT || ALA || align=right | 6.3 km || 
|-id=974 bgcolor=#d6d6d6
| 184974 ||  || — || December 24, 2005 || Kitt Peak || Spacewatch || 3:2 || align=right | 7.7 km || 
|-id=975 bgcolor=#C2FFFF
| 184975 ||  || — || January 20, 2006 || Kitt Peak || Spacewatch || L5 || align=right | 12 km || 
|-id=976 bgcolor=#C2FFFF
| 184976 ||  || — || January 23, 2006 || Kitt Peak || Spacewatch || L5 || align=right | 11 km || 
|-id=977 bgcolor=#C2FFFF
| 184977 ||  || — || January 25, 2006 || Kitt Peak || Spacewatch || L5 || align=right | 12 km || 
|-id=978 bgcolor=#C2FFFF
| 184978 ||  || — || January 26, 2006 || Mount Lemmon || Mount Lemmon Survey || L5 || align=right | 10 km || 
|-id=979 bgcolor=#C2FFFF
| 184979 ||  || — || January 26, 2006 || Mount Lemmon || Mount Lemmon Survey || L5 || align=right | 13 km || 
|-id=980 bgcolor=#C2FFFF
| 184980 ||  || — || January 22, 2006 || Catalina || CSS || L5 || align=right | 16 km || 
|-id=981 bgcolor=#C2FFFF
| 184981 ||  || — || January 30, 2006 || Kitt Peak || Spacewatch || L5 || align=right | 10 km || 
|-id=982 bgcolor=#C2FFFF
| 184982 ||  || — || January 31, 2006 || Kitt Peak || Spacewatch || L5 || align=right | 11 km || 
|-id=983 bgcolor=#C2FFFF
| 184983 ||  || — || February 1, 2006 || Mount Lemmon || Mount Lemmon Survey || L5 || align=right | 11 km || 
|-id=984 bgcolor=#C2FFFF
| 184984 ||  || — || February 2, 2006 || Kitt Peak || Spacewatch || L5 || align=right | 13 km || 
|-id=985 bgcolor=#C2FFFF
| 184985 ||  || — || February 4, 2006 || Kitt Peak || Spacewatch || L5 || align=right | 9.9 km || 
|-id=986 bgcolor=#C2FFFF
| 184986 ||  || — || February 25, 2006 || Mount Lemmon || Mount Lemmon Survey || L5 || align=right | 10 km || 
|-id=987 bgcolor=#fefefe
| 184987 ||  || — || February 27, 2006 || Kitt Peak || Spacewatch || — || align=right | 1.3 km || 
|-id=988 bgcolor=#C2FFFF
| 184988 ||  || — || March 23, 2006 || Catalina || CSS || L5 || align=right | 16 km || 
|-id=989 bgcolor=#d6d6d6
| 184989 ||  || — || May 21, 2006 || Kitt Peak || Spacewatch || — || align=right | 3.5 km || 
|-id=990 bgcolor=#FFC2E0
| 184990 ||  || — || May 28, 2006 || Anderson Mesa || LONEOS || APO +1km || align=right | 2.0 km || 
|-id=991 bgcolor=#fefefe
| 184991 ||  || — || June 11, 2006 || Palomar || NEAT || NYS || align=right | 1.4 km || 
|-id=992 bgcolor=#fefefe
| 184992 ||  || — || June 20, 2006 || Mount Lemmon || Mount Lemmon Survey || — || align=right | 1.9 km || 
|-id=993 bgcolor=#fefefe
| 184993 ||  || — || June 18, 2006 || Kitt Peak || Spacewatch || — || align=right | 1.2 km || 
|-id=994 bgcolor=#E9E9E9
| 184994 ||  || — || June 20, 2006 || Kitt Peak || Spacewatch || — || align=right | 2.1 km || 
|-id=995 bgcolor=#E9E9E9
| 184995 ||  || — || June 22, 2006 || Palomar || NEAT || — || align=right | 3.6 km || 
|-id=996 bgcolor=#d6d6d6
| 184996 ||  || — || July 21, 2006 || Mount Lemmon || Mount Lemmon Survey || THM || align=right | 3.6 km || 
|-id=997 bgcolor=#fefefe
| 184997 ||  || — || July 21, 2006 || Mount Lemmon || Mount Lemmon Survey || — || align=right data-sort-value="0.91" | 910 m || 
|-id=998 bgcolor=#fefefe
| 184998 ||  || — || July 21, 2006 || Mount Lemmon || Mount Lemmon Survey || — || align=right | 3.1 km || 
|-id=999 bgcolor=#fefefe
| 184999 || 2006 PD || — || August 2, 2006 || Pla D'Arguines || R. Ferrando || NYS || align=right data-sort-value="0.82" | 820 m || 
|-id=000 bgcolor=#d6d6d6
| 185000 ||  || — || August 12, 2006 || Palomar || NEAT || — || align=right | 6.2 km || 
|}

References

External links 
 Discovery Circumstances: Numbered Minor Planets (180001)–(185000) (IAU Minor Planet Center)

0184